

374001–374100 

|-bgcolor=#d6d6d6
| 374001 ||  || — || January 27, 2004 || Catalina || CSS || — || align=right | 4.3 km || 
|-id=002 bgcolor=#fefefe
| 374002 ||  || — || January 16, 2004 || Kitt Peak || Spacewatch || — || align=right data-sort-value="0.67" | 670 m || 
|-id=003 bgcolor=#d6d6d6
| 374003 ||  || — || January 24, 2004 || Socorro || LINEAR || — || align=right | 3.4 km || 
|-id=004 bgcolor=#d6d6d6
| 374004 ||  || — || January 30, 2004 || Anderson Mesa || LONEOS || TIR || align=right | 3.7 km || 
|-id=005 bgcolor=#fefefe
| 374005 ||  || — || February 11, 2004 || Palomar || NEAT || — || align=right data-sort-value="0.98" | 980 m || 
|-id=006 bgcolor=#d6d6d6
| 374006 ||  || — || February 12, 2004 || Kitt Peak || Spacewatch || — || align=right | 1.9 km || 
|-id=007 bgcolor=#d6d6d6
| 374007 ||  || — || February 12, 2004 || Palomar || NEAT || LIX || align=right | 4.6 km || 
|-id=008 bgcolor=#d6d6d6
| 374008 ||  || — || February 10, 2004 || Palomar || NEAT || — || align=right | 3.5 km || 
|-id=009 bgcolor=#d6d6d6
| 374009 ||  || — || February 13, 2004 || Palomar || NEAT || — || align=right | 3.7 km || 
|-id=010 bgcolor=#d6d6d6
| 374010 ||  || — || February 13, 2004 || Kitt Peak || Spacewatch || 7:4 || align=right | 4.6 km || 
|-id=011 bgcolor=#fefefe
| 374011 ||  || — || February 15, 2004 || Catalina || CSS || NYS || align=right data-sort-value="0.86" | 860 m || 
|-id=012 bgcolor=#d6d6d6
| 374012 ||  || — || February 10, 2004 || Palomar || NEAT || — || align=right | 4.4 km || 
|-id=013 bgcolor=#fefefe
| 374013 ||  || — || February 17, 2004 || Kitt Peak || Spacewatch || — || align=right data-sort-value="0.65" | 650 m || 
|-id=014 bgcolor=#fefefe
| 374014 ||  || — || February 17, 2004 || Kitt Peak || Spacewatch || NYS || align=right data-sort-value="0.81" | 810 m || 
|-id=015 bgcolor=#fefefe
| 374015 ||  || — || February 16, 2004 || Socorro || LINEAR || — || align=right data-sort-value="0.82" | 820 m || 
|-id=016 bgcolor=#fefefe
| 374016 ||  || — || February 23, 2004 || Socorro || LINEAR || NYS || align=right data-sort-value="0.89" | 890 m || 
|-id=017 bgcolor=#fefefe
| 374017 ||  || — || February 19, 2004 || Socorro || LINEAR || ERI || align=right | 1.9 km || 
|-id=018 bgcolor=#fefefe
| 374018 ||  || — || February 26, 2004 || Socorro || LINEAR || ERI || align=right | 1.4 km || 
|-id=019 bgcolor=#fefefe
| 374019 ||  || — || February 23, 2004 || Socorro || LINEAR || — || align=right data-sort-value="0.94" | 940 m || 
|-id=020 bgcolor=#fefefe
| 374020 ||  || — || March 11, 2004 || Palomar || NEAT || — || align=right | 1.1 km || 
|-id=021 bgcolor=#fefefe
| 374021 ||  || — || March 14, 2004 || Kitt Peak || Spacewatch || — || align=right data-sort-value="0.92" | 920 m || 
|-id=022 bgcolor=#FA8072
| 374022 ||  || — || March 14, 2004 || Palomar || NEAT || H || align=right data-sort-value="0.76" | 760 m || 
|-id=023 bgcolor=#fefefe
| 374023 ||  || — || March 15, 2004 || Catalina || CSS || NYS || align=right data-sort-value="0.79" | 790 m || 
|-id=024 bgcolor=#d6d6d6
| 374024 ||  || — || March 15, 2004 || Kitt Peak || Spacewatch || 7:4 || align=right | 3.9 km || 
|-id=025 bgcolor=#d6d6d6
| 374025 ||  || — || March 12, 2004 || Palomar || NEAT || LIX || align=right | 4.6 km || 
|-id=026 bgcolor=#fefefe
| 374026 ||  || — || March 15, 2004 || Socorro || LINEAR || NYS || align=right data-sort-value="0.88" | 880 m || 
|-id=027 bgcolor=#fefefe
| 374027 ||  || — || March 18, 2004 || Socorro || LINEAR || H || align=right data-sort-value="0.80" | 800 m || 
|-id=028 bgcolor=#fefefe
| 374028 ||  || — || March 23, 2004 || Socorro || LINEAR || H || align=right data-sort-value="0.59" | 590 m || 
|-id=029 bgcolor=#d6d6d6
| 374029 ||  || — || March 16, 2004 || Kitt Peak || Spacewatch || — || align=right | 2.9 km || 
|-id=030 bgcolor=#fefefe
| 374030 ||  || — || March 16, 2004 || Kitt Peak || Spacewatch || — || align=right data-sort-value="0.77" | 770 m || 
|-id=031 bgcolor=#d6d6d6
| 374031 ||  || — || March 18, 2004 || Kitt Peak || Spacewatch || — || align=right | 4.0 km || 
|-id=032 bgcolor=#d6d6d6
| 374032 ||  || — || March 18, 2004 || Socorro || LINEAR || — || align=right | 4.7 km || 
|-id=033 bgcolor=#fefefe
| 374033 ||  || — || March 25, 2004 || Anderson Mesa || LONEOS || — || align=right | 1.2 km || 
|-id=034 bgcolor=#fefefe
| 374034 ||  || — || March 22, 2004 || Socorro || LINEAR || — || align=right | 1.2 km || 
|-id=035 bgcolor=#fefefe
| 374035 ||  || — || March 27, 2004 || Socorro || LINEAR || — || align=right | 1.2 km || 
|-id=036 bgcolor=#fefefe
| 374036 ||  || — || March 19, 2004 || Socorro || LINEAR || H || align=right data-sort-value="0.71" | 710 m || 
|-id=037 bgcolor=#fefefe
| 374037 ||  || — || January 7, 2000 || Kitt Peak || Spacewatch || MAS || align=right data-sort-value="0.68" | 680 m || 
|-id=038 bgcolor=#FFC2E0
| 374038 || 2004 HW || — || April 18, 2004 || Siding Spring || SSS || APO +1kmPHA || align=right | 1.4 km || 
|-id=039 bgcolor=#fefefe
| 374039 ||  || — || April 16, 2004 || Kitt Peak || Spacewatch || FLO || align=right data-sort-value="0.87" | 870 m || 
|-id=040 bgcolor=#fefefe
| 374040 ||  || — || April 21, 2004 || Socorro || LINEAR || — || align=right data-sort-value="0.97" | 970 m || 
|-id=041 bgcolor=#E9E9E9
| 374041 ||  || — || May 14, 2004 || Palomar || NEAT || — || align=right | 1.5 km || 
|-id=042 bgcolor=#fefefe
| 374042 ||  || — || May 16, 2004 || Socorro || LINEAR || — || align=right | 1.1 km || 
|-id=043 bgcolor=#fefefe
| 374043 ||  || — || June 9, 2004 || Siding Spring || SSS || H || align=right data-sort-value="0.97" | 970 m || 
|-id=044 bgcolor=#E9E9E9
| 374044 ||  || — || June 16, 2004 || Catalina || CSS || BAR || align=right | 1.9 km || 
|-id=045 bgcolor=#E9E9E9
| 374045 ||  || — || July 11, 2004 || Socorro || LINEAR || — || align=right | 1.1 km || 
|-id=046 bgcolor=#E9E9E9
| 374046 ||  || — || June 27, 2004 || Siding Spring || SSS || — || align=right | 1.8 km || 
|-id=047 bgcolor=#E9E9E9
| 374047 ||  || — || June 27, 2004 || Siding Spring || SSS || — || align=right | 2.4 km || 
|-id=048 bgcolor=#E9E9E9
| 374048 ||  || — || August 3, 2004 || Siding Spring || SSS || — || align=right | 2.0 km || 
|-id=049 bgcolor=#E9E9E9
| 374049 ||  || — || August 5, 2004 || Palomar || NEAT || — || align=right | 2.8 km || 
|-id=050 bgcolor=#E9E9E9
| 374050 ||  || — || August 7, 2004 || Palomar || NEAT || JUN || align=right | 1.5 km || 
|-id=051 bgcolor=#E9E9E9
| 374051 ||  || — || August 8, 2004 || Anderson Mesa || LONEOS || EUN || align=right | 1.6 km || 
|-id=052 bgcolor=#E9E9E9
| 374052 ||  || — || August 8, 2004 || Anderson Mesa || LONEOS || AER || align=right | 1.8 km || 
|-id=053 bgcolor=#E9E9E9
| 374053 ||  || — || August 6, 2004 || Palomar || NEAT || — || align=right | 1.7 km || 
|-id=054 bgcolor=#E9E9E9
| 374054 ||  || — || August 7, 2004 || Palomar || NEAT || — || align=right | 1.7 km || 
|-id=055 bgcolor=#E9E9E9
| 374055 ||  || — || August 8, 2004 || Socorro || LINEAR || — || align=right | 2.1 km || 
|-id=056 bgcolor=#E9E9E9
| 374056 ||  || — || August 10, 2004 || Socorro || LINEAR || — || align=right | 2.0 km || 
|-id=057 bgcolor=#E9E9E9
| 374057 ||  || — || August 9, 2004 || Socorro || LINEAR || JUN || align=right | 1.3 km || 
|-id=058 bgcolor=#E9E9E9
| 374058 ||  || — || August 10, 2004 || Socorro || LINEAR || — || align=right | 4.0 km || 
|-id=059 bgcolor=#E9E9E9
| 374059 ||  || — || August 11, 2004 || Socorro || LINEAR || — || align=right | 1.9 km || 
|-id=060 bgcolor=#E9E9E9
| 374060 ||  || — || August 11, 2004 || Goodricke-Pigott || Goodricke-Pigott Obs. || JUN || align=right | 1.4 km || 
|-id=061 bgcolor=#E9E9E9
| 374061 ||  || — || August 21, 2004 || Siding Spring || SSS || — || align=right | 2.8 km || 
|-id=062 bgcolor=#E9E9E9
| 374062 ||  || — || September 6, 2004 || Goodricke-Pigott || Goodricke-Pigott Obs. || — || align=right | 1.8 km || 
|-id=063 bgcolor=#E9E9E9
| 374063 ||  || — || August 11, 2004 || Socorro || LINEAR || — || align=right | 1.5 km || 
|-id=064 bgcolor=#E9E9E9
| 374064 ||  || — || August 23, 2004 || Anderson Mesa || LONEOS || — || align=right | 2.0 km || 
|-id=065 bgcolor=#E9E9E9
| 374065 ||  || — || September 7, 2004 || Socorro || LINEAR || — || align=right | 3.9 km || 
|-id=066 bgcolor=#E9E9E9
| 374066 ||  || — || September 8, 2004 || Socorro || LINEAR || — || align=right | 1.7 km || 
|-id=067 bgcolor=#E9E9E9
| 374067 ||  || — || September 8, 2004 || Socorro || LINEAR || — || align=right | 1.4 km || 
|-id=068 bgcolor=#fefefe
| 374068 ||  || — || September 8, 2004 || Socorro || LINEAR || — || align=right data-sort-value="0.84" | 840 m || 
|-id=069 bgcolor=#E9E9E9
| 374069 ||  || — || August 10, 2004 || Anderson Mesa || LONEOS || JUN || align=right | 1.4 km || 
|-id=070 bgcolor=#E9E9E9
| 374070 ||  || — || September 6, 2004 || Bergisch Gladbach || W. Bickel || — || align=right | 1.7 km || 
|-id=071 bgcolor=#E9E9E9
| 374071 ||  || — || September 7, 2004 || Kitt Peak || Spacewatch || — || align=right | 2.6 km || 
|-id=072 bgcolor=#E9E9E9
| 374072 ||  || — || September 7, 2004 || Kitt Peak || Spacewatch || — || align=right | 1.4 km || 
|-id=073 bgcolor=#E9E9E9
| 374073 ||  || — || September 8, 2004 || Palomar || NEAT || — || align=right | 2.4 km || 
|-id=074 bgcolor=#E9E9E9
| 374074 ||  || — || August 20, 2004 || Catalina || CSS || — || align=right | 3.0 km || 
|-id=075 bgcolor=#E9E9E9
| 374075 ||  || — || September 8, 2004 || Socorro || LINEAR || — || align=right | 2.4 km || 
|-id=076 bgcolor=#E9E9E9
| 374076 ||  || — || September 9, 2004 || Needville || Needville Obs. || — || align=right | 2.4 km || 
|-id=077 bgcolor=#E9E9E9
| 374077 ||  || — || September 9, 2004 || Socorro || LINEAR || HNS || align=right | 1.2 km || 
|-id=078 bgcolor=#E9E9E9
| 374078 ||  || — || September 9, 2004 || Socorro || LINEAR || — || align=right | 1.8 km || 
|-id=079 bgcolor=#E9E9E9
| 374079 ||  || — || September 10, 2004 || Socorro || LINEAR || — || align=right | 2.4 km || 
|-id=080 bgcolor=#E9E9E9
| 374080 ||  || — || September 8, 2004 || Socorro || LINEAR || — || align=right | 1.2 km || 
|-id=081 bgcolor=#E9E9E9
| 374081 ||  || — || September 7, 2004 || Socorro || LINEAR || — || align=right | 1.8 km || 
|-id=082 bgcolor=#E9E9E9
| 374082 ||  || — || September 8, 2004 || Socorro || LINEAR || EUN || align=right | 1.4 km || 
|-id=083 bgcolor=#E9E9E9
| 374083 ||  || — || September 10, 2004 || Socorro || LINEAR || AER || align=right | 1.5 km || 
|-id=084 bgcolor=#E9E9E9
| 374084 ||  || — || September 10, 2004 || Socorro || LINEAR || — || align=right | 2.8 km || 
|-id=085 bgcolor=#E9E9E9
| 374085 ||  || — || September 10, 2004 || Socorro || LINEAR || — || align=right | 3.1 km || 
|-id=086 bgcolor=#E9E9E9
| 374086 ||  || — || September 10, 2004 || Socorro || LINEAR || — || align=right | 2.5 km || 
|-id=087 bgcolor=#E9E9E9
| 374087 ||  || — || August 20, 2004 || Socorro || LINEAR || — || align=right | 2.1 km || 
|-id=088 bgcolor=#E9E9E9
| 374088 ||  || — || September 11, 2004 || Socorro || LINEAR || — || align=right | 3.0 km || 
|-id=089 bgcolor=#E9E9E9
| 374089 ||  || — || September 11, 2004 || Socorro || LINEAR || — || align=right | 2.0 km || 
|-id=090 bgcolor=#E9E9E9
| 374090 ||  || — || September 9, 2004 || Socorro || LINEAR || ADE || align=right | 3.0 km || 
|-id=091 bgcolor=#E9E9E9
| 374091 ||  || — || September 9, 2004 || Kitt Peak || Spacewatch || — || align=right | 2.5 km || 
|-id=092 bgcolor=#E9E9E9
| 374092 ||  || — || September 9, 2004 || Kitt Peak || Spacewatch || AEO || align=right | 1.0 km || 
|-id=093 bgcolor=#E9E9E9
| 374093 ||  || — || September 9, 2004 || Kitt Peak || Spacewatch || — || align=right | 2.9 km || 
|-id=094 bgcolor=#E9E9E9
| 374094 ||  || — || September 10, 2004 || Socorro || LINEAR || — || align=right | 1.9 km || 
|-id=095 bgcolor=#E9E9E9
| 374095 ||  || — || September 10, 2004 || Kitt Peak || Spacewatch || — || align=right | 1.6 km || 
|-id=096 bgcolor=#E9E9E9
| 374096 ||  || — || September 10, 2004 || Kitt Peak || Spacewatch || MIS || align=right | 2.5 km || 
|-id=097 bgcolor=#E9E9E9
| 374097 ||  || — || September 9, 2004 || Socorro || LINEAR || — || align=right | 1.5 km || 
|-id=098 bgcolor=#E9E9E9
| 374098 ||  || — || September 10, 2004 || Kitt Peak || Spacewatch || NEM || align=right | 1.9 km || 
|-id=099 bgcolor=#E9E9E9
| 374099 ||  || — || September 11, 2004 || Kitt Peak || Spacewatch || — || align=right | 1.8 km || 
|-id=100 bgcolor=#E9E9E9
| 374100 ||  || — || September 15, 2004 || Kitt Peak || Spacewatch || — || align=right | 1.4 km || 
|}

374101–374200 

|-bgcolor=#E9E9E9
| 374101 ||  || — || September 10, 2004 || Palomar || NEAT || — || align=right | 2.1 km || 
|-id=102 bgcolor=#E9E9E9
| 374102 ||  || — || September 15, 2004 || Socorro || LINEAR || — || align=right | 3.7 km || 
|-id=103 bgcolor=#E9E9E9
| 374103 ||  || — || September 10, 2004 || Socorro || LINEAR || — || align=right | 2.2 km || 
|-id=104 bgcolor=#E9E9E9
| 374104 ||  || — || September 15, 2004 || Siding Spring || SSS || — || align=right | 1.6 km || 
|-id=105 bgcolor=#E9E9E9
| 374105 ||  || — || September 15, 2004 || Kitt Peak || Spacewatch || — || align=right | 2.3 km || 
|-id=106 bgcolor=#E9E9E9
| 374106 ||  || — || September 12, 2004 || Kitt Peak || Spacewatch || — || align=right | 2.0 km || 
|-id=107 bgcolor=#E9E9E9
| 374107 ||  || — || September 16, 2004 || Socorro || LINEAR || — || align=right | 4.3 km || 
|-id=108 bgcolor=#E9E9E9
| 374108 ||  || — || September 17, 2004 || Kitt Peak || Spacewatch || — || align=right | 2.1 km || 
|-id=109 bgcolor=#E9E9E9
| 374109 ||  || — || September 17, 2004 || Kitt Peak || Spacewatch || — || align=right | 2.4 km || 
|-id=110 bgcolor=#E9E9E9
| 374110 ||  || — || September 17, 2004 || Kitt Peak || Spacewatch || NEM || align=right | 2.4 km || 
|-id=111 bgcolor=#E9E9E9
| 374111 ||  || — || September 17, 2004 || Socorro || LINEAR || — || align=right | 2.8 km || 
|-id=112 bgcolor=#E9E9E9
| 374112 ||  || — || September 17, 2004 || Socorro || LINEAR || — || align=right | 2.6 km || 
|-id=113 bgcolor=#E9E9E9
| 374113 ||  || — || September 17, 2004 || Socorro || LINEAR || — || align=right | 2.7 km || 
|-id=114 bgcolor=#E9E9E9
| 374114 ||  || — || August 28, 1995 || Kitt Peak || Spacewatch || — || align=right | 2.4 km || 
|-id=115 bgcolor=#E9E9E9
| 374115 ||  || — || October 4, 2004 || Anderson Mesa || LONEOS || — || align=right | 2.7 km || 
|-id=116 bgcolor=#E9E9E9
| 374116 ||  || — || August 21, 2004 || Siding Spring || SSS || — || align=right | 2.2 km || 
|-id=117 bgcolor=#E9E9E9
| 374117 ||  || — || October 10, 2004 || Socorro || LINEAR || — || align=right | 2.4 km || 
|-id=118 bgcolor=#E9E9E9
| 374118 ||  || — || October 13, 2004 || Goodricke-Pigott || R. A. Tucker || — || align=right | 2.8 km || 
|-id=119 bgcolor=#E9E9E9
| 374119 ||  || — || October 4, 2004 || Kitt Peak || Spacewatch || — || align=right | 2.1 km || 
|-id=120 bgcolor=#E9E9E9
| 374120 ||  || — || October 4, 2004 || Kitt Peak || Spacewatch || — || align=right | 2.2 km || 
|-id=121 bgcolor=#E9E9E9
| 374121 ||  || — || October 4, 2004 || Kitt Peak || Spacewatch || — || align=right | 1.8 km || 
|-id=122 bgcolor=#E9E9E9
| 374122 ||  || — || October 4, 2004 || Kitt Peak || Spacewatch || — || align=right | 2.8 km || 
|-id=123 bgcolor=#E9E9E9
| 374123 ||  || — || October 5, 2004 || Palomar || NEAT || — || align=right | 3.0 km || 
|-id=124 bgcolor=#E9E9E9
| 374124 ||  || — || October 5, 2004 || Anderson Mesa || LONEOS || — || align=right | 3.5 km || 
|-id=125 bgcolor=#E9E9E9
| 374125 ||  || — || August 19, 2004 || Siding Spring || SSS || ADE || align=right | 2.2 km || 
|-id=126 bgcolor=#E9E9E9
| 374126 ||  || — || October 6, 2004 || Kitt Peak || Spacewatch || WIT || align=right | 1.2 km || 
|-id=127 bgcolor=#E9E9E9
| 374127 ||  || — || October 6, 2004 || Kitt Peak || Spacewatch || — || align=right | 4.0 km || 
|-id=128 bgcolor=#E9E9E9
| 374128 ||  || — || October 7, 2004 || Socorro || LINEAR || — || align=right | 2.1 km || 
|-id=129 bgcolor=#E9E9E9
| 374129 ||  || — || October 7, 2004 || Socorro || LINEAR || — || align=right | 2.2 km || 
|-id=130 bgcolor=#E9E9E9
| 374130 ||  || — || October 8, 2004 || Palomar || NEAT || — || align=right | 2.0 km || 
|-id=131 bgcolor=#E9E9E9
| 374131 ||  || — || October 12, 2004 || Moletai || Molėtai Obs. || — || align=right | 3.2 km || 
|-id=132 bgcolor=#E9E9E9
| 374132 ||  || — || October 4, 2004 || Socorro || LINEAR || — || align=right | 4.2 km || 
|-id=133 bgcolor=#E9E9E9
| 374133 ||  || — || October 7, 2004 || Anderson Mesa || LONEOS || WIT || align=right | 1.2 km || 
|-id=134 bgcolor=#E9E9E9
| 374134 ||  || — || October 7, 2004 || Socorro || LINEAR || — || align=right | 1.9 km || 
|-id=135 bgcolor=#E9E9E9
| 374135 ||  || — || October 7, 2004 || Socorro || LINEAR || — || align=right | 2.2 km || 
|-id=136 bgcolor=#E9E9E9
| 374136 ||  || — || October 7, 2004 || Palomar || NEAT || — || align=right | 2.9 km || 
|-id=137 bgcolor=#E9E9E9
| 374137 ||  || — || October 7, 2004 || Palomar || NEAT || — || align=right | 3.3 km || 
|-id=138 bgcolor=#E9E9E9
| 374138 ||  || — || October 8, 2004 || Anderson Mesa || LONEOS || — || align=right | 2.3 km || 
|-id=139 bgcolor=#E9E9E9
| 374139 ||  || — || October 8, 2004 || Anderson Mesa || LONEOS || — || align=right | 1.5 km || 
|-id=140 bgcolor=#E9E9E9
| 374140 ||  || — || October 6, 2004 || Kitt Peak || Spacewatch || NEM || align=right | 2.5 km || 
|-id=141 bgcolor=#E9E9E9
| 374141 ||  || — || October 9, 2004 || Socorro || LINEAR || — || align=right | 1.9 km || 
|-id=142 bgcolor=#E9E9E9
| 374142 ||  || — || September 24, 2004 || Kitt Peak || Spacewatch || — || align=right | 1.7 km || 
|-id=143 bgcolor=#E9E9E9
| 374143 ||  || — || October 7, 2004 || Kitt Peak || Spacewatch || — || align=right | 1.6 km || 
|-id=144 bgcolor=#E9E9E9
| 374144 ||  || — || October 7, 2004 || Kitt Peak || Spacewatch || — || align=right | 3.5 km || 
|-id=145 bgcolor=#E9E9E9
| 374145 ||  || — || October 7, 2004 || Kitt Peak || Spacewatch || — || align=right | 2.7 km || 
|-id=146 bgcolor=#E9E9E9
| 374146 ||  || — || October 8, 2004 || Kitt Peak || Spacewatch || — || align=right | 2.9 km || 
|-id=147 bgcolor=#E9E9E9
| 374147 ||  || — || October 8, 2004 || Kitt Peak || Spacewatch || — || align=right | 2.9 km || 
|-id=148 bgcolor=#E9E9E9
| 374148 ||  || — || September 22, 2004 || Anderson Mesa || LONEOS || — || align=right | 2.8 km || 
|-id=149 bgcolor=#E9E9E9
| 374149 ||  || — || October 7, 2004 || Kitt Peak || Spacewatch || — || align=right | 3.1 km || 
|-id=150 bgcolor=#E9E9E9
| 374150 ||  || — || October 9, 2004 || Kitt Peak || Spacewatch || NEM || align=right | 2.3 km || 
|-id=151 bgcolor=#E9E9E9
| 374151 ||  || — || October 9, 2004 || Kitt Peak || Spacewatch || — || align=right | 2.7 km || 
|-id=152 bgcolor=#E9E9E9
| 374152 ||  || — || October 9, 2004 || Kitt Peak || Spacewatch || — || align=right | 1.9 km || 
|-id=153 bgcolor=#E9E9E9
| 374153 ||  || — || October 9, 2004 || Kitt Peak || Spacewatch || — || align=right | 2.5 km || 
|-id=154 bgcolor=#E9E9E9
| 374154 ||  || — || October 7, 2004 || Kitt Peak || Spacewatch || HOF || align=right | 2.6 km || 
|-id=155 bgcolor=#E9E9E9
| 374155 ||  || — || October 10, 2004 || Socorro || LINEAR || — || align=right | 2.5 km || 
|-id=156 bgcolor=#E9E9E9
| 374156 ||  || — || October 15, 2004 || Socorro || LINEAR || EUN || align=right | 1.6 km || 
|-id=157 bgcolor=#E9E9E9
| 374157 ||  || — || October 5, 2004 || Kitt Peak || Spacewatch || — || align=right | 2.1 km || 
|-id=158 bgcolor=#FFC2E0
| 374158 || 2004 UL || — || October 18, 2004 || Socorro || LINEAR || APOPHA || align=right data-sort-value="0.65" | 650 m || 
|-id=159 bgcolor=#E9E9E9
| 374159 ||  || — || October 18, 2004 || Kitt Peak || M. W. Buie || — || align=right | 3.3 km || 
|-id=160 bgcolor=#E9E9E9
| 374160 ||  || — || November 3, 2004 || Palomar || NEAT || — || align=right | 2.9 km || 
|-id=161 bgcolor=#E9E9E9
| 374161 ||  || — || November 3, 2004 || Kitt Peak || Spacewatch || — || align=right | 1.9 km || 
|-id=162 bgcolor=#E9E9E9
| 374162 ||  || — || November 5, 2004 || Anderson Mesa || LONEOS || — || align=right | 3.5 km || 
|-id=163 bgcolor=#E9E9E9
| 374163 ||  || — || November 4, 2004 || Catalina || CSS || — || align=right | 2.7 km || 
|-id=164 bgcolor=#E9E9E9
| 374164 ||  || — || October 10, 2004 || Kitt Peak || Spacewatch || — || align=right | 3.0 km || 
|-id=165 bgcolor=#E9E9E9
| 374165 ||  || — || November 4, 2004 || Kitt Peak || Spacewatch || — || align=right | 2.9 km || 
|-id=166 bgcolor=#E9E9E9
| 374166 ||  || — || November 4, 2004 || Kitt Peak || Spacewatch || GEF || align=right | 1.9 km || 
|-id=167 bgcolor=#E9E9E9
| 374167 ||  || — || November 7, 2004 || Socorro || LINEAR || — || align=right | 3.0 km || 
|-id=168 bgcolor=#E9E9E9
| 374168 ||  || — || November 4, 2004 || Catalina || CSS || — || align=right | 2.8 km || 
|-id=169 bgcolor=#E9E9E9
| 374169 ||  || — || November 9, 2004 || Catalina || CSS || PAD || align=right | 2.9 km || 
|-id=170 bgcolor=#E9E9E9
| 374170 ||  || — || November 4, 2004 || Kitt Peak || Spacewatch || AGN || align=right | 1.0 km || 
|-id=171 bgcolor=#E9E9E9
| 374171 ||  || — || November 12, 2004 || Catalina || CSS || — || align=right | 3.5 km || 
|-id=172 bgcolor=#E9E9E9
| 374172 ||  || — || October 10, 2004 || Kitt Peak || Spacewatch || — || align=right | 2.9 km || 
|-id=173 bgcolor=#E9E9E9
| 374173 ||  || — || October 7, 2004 || Kitt Peak || Spacewatch || HOF || align=right | 2.4 km || 
|-id=174 bgcolor=#E9E9E9
| 374174 ||  || — || November 19, 2004 || Catalina || CSS || — || align=right | 3.1 km || 
|-id=175 bgcolor=#E9E9E9
| 374175 ||  || — || December 1, 2004 || Palomar || NEAT || INO || align=right | 1.4 km || 
|-id=176 bgcolor=#E9E9E9
| 374176 ||  || — || December 8, 2004 || Socorro || LINEAR || — || align=right | 3.1 km || 
|-id=177 bgcolor=#E9E9E9
| 374177 ||  || — || December 7, 2004 || Socorro || LINEAR || — || align=right | 3.1 km || 
|-id=178 bgcolor=#E9E9E9
| 374178 ||  || — || December 2, 2004 || Anderson Mesa || LONEOS || — || align=right | 2.8 km || 
|-id=179 bgcolor=#E9E9E9
| 374179 ||  || — || December 10, 2004 || Socorro || LINEAR || — || align=right | 3.3 km || 
|-id=180 bgcolor=#E9E9E9
| 374180 ||  || — || December 11, 2004 || Socorro || LINEAR || DOR || align=right | 2.8 km || 
|-id=181 bgcolor=#E9E9E9
| 374181 ||  || — || December 9, 2004 || Catalina || CSS || — || align=right | 3.0 km || 
|-id=182 bgcolor=#E9E9E9
| 374182 ||  || — || December 14, 2004 || Catalina || CSS || — || align=right | 3.0 km || 
|-id=183 bgcolor=#C2FFFF
| 374183 ||  || — || December 14, 2004 || Kitt Peak || Spacewatch || L5 || align=right | 11 km || 
|-id=184 bgcolor=#E9E9E9
| 374184 ||  || — || December 15, 2004 || Socorro || LINEAR || — || align=right | 3.3 km || 
|-id=185 bgcolor=#E9E9E9
| 374185 ||  || — || December 16, 2004 || Anderson Mesa || LONEOS || — || align=right | 3.4 km || 
|-id=186 bgcolor=#d6d6d6
| 374186 ||  || — || December 18, 2004 || Mount Lemmon || Mount Lemmon Survey || — || align=right | 3.2 km || 
|-id=187 bgcolor=#E9E9E9
| 374187 ||  || — || December 16, 2004 || Anderson Mesa || LONEOS || — || align=right | 2.3 km || 
|-id=188 bgcolor=#FFC2E0
| 374188 ||  || — || January 6, 2005 || Socorro || LINEAR || AMO +1km || align=right | 1.2 km || 
|-id=189 bgcolor=#d6d6d6
| 374189 ||  || — || January 13, 2005 || Socorro || LINEAR || 629 || align=right | 1.7 km || 
|-id=190 bgcolor=#d6d6d6
| 374190 ||  || — || January 13, 2005 || Kitt Peak || Spacewatch || — || align=right | 2.8 km || 
|-id=191 bgcolor=#d6d6d6
| 374191 ||  || — || January 13, 2005 || Kitt Peak || Spacewatch || — || align=right | 2.4 km || 
|-id=192 bgcolor=#fefefe
| 374192 ||  || — || January 16, 2005 || Socorro || LINEAR || — || align=right data-sort-value="0.87" | 870 m || 
|-id=193 bgcolor=#fefefe
| 374193 ||  || — || February 1, 2005 || Kitt Peak || Spacewatch || — || align=right data-sort-value="0.73" | 730 m || 
|-id=194 bgcolor=#d6d6d6
| 374194 ||  || — || February 4, 2005 || Mount Lemmon || Mount Lemmon Survey || — || align=right | 2.5 km || 
|-id=195 bgcolor=#d6d6d6
| 374195 ||  || — || February 9, 2005 || Kitt Peak || Spacewatch || — || align=right | 3.4 km || 
|-id=196 bgcolor=#d6d6d6
| 374196 ||  || — || March 3, 2005 || Catalina || CSS || — || align=right | 3.9 km || 
|-id=197 bgcolor=#d6d6d6
| 374197 ||  || — || March 3, 2005 || Catalina || CSS || — || align=right | 3.3 km || 
|-id=198 bgcolor=#fefefe
| 374198 ||  || — || March 3, 2005 || Jarnac || Jarnac Obs. || FLO || align=right data-sort-value="0.66" | 660 m || 
|-id=199 bgcolor=#d6d6d6
| 374199 ||  || — || March 3, 2005 || Catalina || CSS || — || align=right | 4.1 km || 
|-id=200 bgcolor=#d6d6d6
| 374200 ||  || — || March 3, 2005 || Catalina || CSS || TIR || align=right | 3.6 km || 
|}

374201–374300 

|-bgcolor=#d6d6d6
| 374201 ||  || — || March 3, 2005 || Kitt Peak || Spacewatch || — || align=right | 3.9 km || 
|-id=202 bgcolor=#d6d6d6
| 374202 ||  || — || March 3, 2005 || Catalina || CSS || — || align=right | 4.1 km || 
|-id=203 bgcolor=#fefefe
| 374203 ||  || — || March 4, 2005 || Catalina || CSS || — || align=right data-sort-value="0.87" | 870 m || 
|-id=204 bgcolor=#d6d6d6
| 374204 ||  || — || March 4, 2005 || Mount Lemmon || Mount Lemmon Survey || — || align=right | 2.9 km || 
|-id=205 bgcolor=#d6d6d6
| 374205 ||  || — || March 8, 2005 || Kitt Peak || Spacewatch || — || align=right | 4.2 km || 
|-id=206 bgcolor=#d6d6d6
| 374206 ||  || — || March 9, 2005 || Anderson Mesa || LONEOS || TIR || align=right | 3.8 km || 
|-id=207 bgcolor=#fefefe
| 374207 ||  || — || March 9, 2005 || Anderson Mesa || LONEOS || FLO || align=right data-sort-value="0.80" | 800 m || 
|-id=208 bgcolor=#d6d6d6
| 374208 ||  || — || March 11, 2005 || Mount Lemmon || Mount Lemmon Survey || — || align=right | 4.4 km || 
|-id=209 bgcolor=#d6d6d6
| 374209 ||  || — || March 11, 2005 || Mount Lemmon || Mount Lemmon Survey || — || align=right | 4.1 km || 
|-id=210 bgcolor=#d6d6d6
| 374210 ||  || — || March 4, 2005 || Kitt Peak || Spacewatch || — || align=right | 3.0 km || 
|-id=211 bgcolor=#d6d6d6
| 374211 ||  || — || March 4, 2005 || Socorro || LINEAR || — || align=right | 4.1 km || 
|-id=212 bgcolor=#d6d6d6
| 374212 ||  || — || March 11, 2005 || Mount Lemmon || Mount Lemmon Survey || — || align=right | 2.5 km || 
|-id=213 bgcolor=#C2FFFF
| 374213 ||  || — || March 2, 2005 || Kitt Peak || Spacewatch || L5 || align=right | 9.4 km || 
|-id=214 bgcolor=#d6d6d6
| 374214 ||  || — || March 8, 2005 || Mount Lemmon || Mount Lemmon Survey || — || align=right | 3.6 km || 
|-id=215 bgcolor=#d6d6d6
| 374215 ||  || — || March 10, 2005 || Mount Lemmon || Mount Lemmon Survey || — || align=right | 3.3 km || 
|-id=216 bgcolor=#d6d6d6
| 374216 ||  || — || March 13, 2005 || Kitt Peak || Spacewatch || — || align=right | 2.7 km || 
|-id=217 bgcolor=#d6d6d6
| 374217 ||  || — || March 10, 2005 || Catalina || CSS || — || align=right | 4.4 km || 
|-id=218 bgcolor=#d6d6d6
| 374218 ||  || — || March 4, 2005 || Mount Lemmon || Mount Lemmon Survey || — || align=right | 3.6 km || 
|-id=219 bgcolor=#fefefe
| 374219 ||  || — || March 10, 2005 || Kitt Peak || M. W. Buie || — || align=right data-sort-value="0.73" | 730 m || 
|-id=220 bgcolor=#d6d6d6
| 374220 ||  || — || March 12, 2005 || Kitt Peak || M. W. Buie || — || align=right | 3.1 km || 
|-id=221 bgcolor=#fefefe
| 374221 ||  || — || March 1, 2005 || Kitt Peak || Spacewatch || — || align=right data-sort-value="0.72" | 720 m || 
|-id=222 bgcolor=#d6d6d6
| 374222 ||  || — || March 10, 2005 || Mount Lemmon || Mount Lemmon Survey || — || align=right | 3.2 km || 
|-id=223 bgcolor=#d6d6d6
| 374223 ||  || — || March 30, 2005 || Catalina || CSS || — || align=right | 6.1 km || 
|-id=224 bgcolor=#fefefe
| 374224 ||  || — || March 16, 2005 || Catalina || CSS || — || align=right data-sort-value="0.87" | 870 m || 
|-id=225 bgcolor=#d6d6d6
| 374225 ||  || — || April 1, 2005 || Kitt Peak || Spacewatch || EOS || align=right | 2.4 km || 
|-id=226 bgcolor=#d6d6d6
| 374226 ||  || — || April 1, 2005 || Kitt Peak || Spacewatch || — || align=right | 3.2 km || 
|-id=227 bgcolor=#E9E9E9
| 374227 ||  || — || April 1, 2005 || Siding Spring || SSS || — || align=right | 2.7 km || 
|-id=228 bgcolor=#d6d6d6
| 374228 ||  || — || April 2, 2005 || Mount Lemmon || Mount Lemmon Survey || — || align=right | 3.2 km || 
|-id=229 bgcolor=#fefefe
| 374229 ||  || — || April 2, 2005 || Mount Lemmon || Mount Lemmon Survey || V || align=right data-sort-value="0.77" | 770 m || 
|-id=230 bgcolor=#d6d6d6
| 374230 ||  || — || April 3, 2005 || Palomar || NEAT || — || align=right | 3.2 km || 
|-id=231 bgcolor=#d6d6d6
| 374231 ||  || — || April 2, 2005 || Mount Lemmon || Mount Lemmon Survey || — || align=right | 3.5 km || 
|-id=232 bgcolor=#fefefe
| 374232 ||  || — || April 3, 2005 || Palomar || NEAT || — || align=right data-sort-value="0.98" | 980 m || 
|-id=233 bgcolor=#d6d6d6
| 374233 ||  || — || April 4, 2005 || Mount Lemmon || Mount Lemmon Survey || — || align=right | 2.4 km || 
|-id=234 bgcolor=#fefefe
| 374234 ||  || — || April 1, 2005 || Kitt Peak || Spacewatch || FLOcritical || align=right data-sort-value="0.56" | 560 m || 
|-id=235 bgcolor=#fefefe
| 374235 ||  || — || April 4, 2005 || Mount Lemmon || Mount Lemmon Survey || V || align=right data-sort-value="0.54" | 540 m || 
|-id=236 bgcolor=#d6d6d6
| 374236 ||  || — || April 5, 2005 || Mount Lemmon || Mount Lemmon Survey || — || align=right | 3.9 km || 
|-id=237 bgcolor=#fefefe
| 374237 ||  || — || April 5, 2005 || Mount Lemmon || Mount Lemmon Survey || — || align=right data-sort-value="0.81" | 810 m || 
|-id=238 bgcolor=#fefefe
| 374238 ||  || — || April 6, 2005 || Mount Lemmon || Mount Lemmon Survey || — || align=right data-sort-value="0.80" | 800 m || 
|-id=239 bgcolor=#d6d6d6
| 374239 ||  || — || April 7, 2005 || Mount Lemmon || Mount Lemmon Survey || — || align=right | 3.0 km || 
|-id=240 bgcolor=#fefefe
| 374240 ||  || — || April 7, 2005 || Kitt Peak || Spacewatch || MAS || align=right data-sort-value="0.62" | 620 m || 
|-id=241 bgcolor=#d6d6d6
| 374241 ||  || — || April 10, 2005 || Mount Lemmon || Mount Lemmon Survey || — || align=right | 3.2 km || 
|-id=242 bgcolor=#fefefe
| 374242 ||  || — || April 10, 2005 || Kitt Peak || Spacewatch || — || align=right data-sort-value="0.71" | 710 m || 
|-id=243 bgcolor=#d6d6d6
| 374243 ||  || — || April 6, 2005 || Mount Lemmon || Mount Lemmon Survey || — || align=right | 3.4 km || 
|-id=244 bgcolor=#d6d6d6
| 374244 ||  || — || April 10, 2005 || Mount Lemmon || Mount Lemmon Survey || ALA || align=right | 2.7 km || 
|-id=245 bgcolor=#d6d6d6
| 374245 ||  || — || April 13, 2005 || Kitt Peak || Spacewatch || — || align=right | 5.0 km || 
|-id=246 bgcolor=#fefefe
| 374246 ||  || — || March 10, 2005 || Mount Lemmon || Mount Lemmon Survey || — || align=right data-sort-value="0.75" | 750 m || 
|-id=247 bgcolor=#fefefe
| 374247 ||  || — || April 13, 2005 || Anderson Mesa || LONEOS || PHO || align=right | 1.0 km || 
|-id=248 bgcolor=#d6d6d6
| 374248 ||  || — || April 12, 2005 || Kitt Peak || Spacewatch || EOS || align=right | 2.6 km || 
|-id=249 bgcolor=#fefefe
| 374249 ||  || — || April 15, 2005 || Kitt Peak || Spacewatch || MAS || align=right data-sort-value="0.62" | 620 m || 
|-id=250 bgcolor=#d6d6d6
| 374250 ||  || — || March 8, 2005 || Mount Lemmon || Mount Lemmon Survey || URS || align=right | 3.4 km || 
|-id=251 bgcolor=#d6d6d6
| 374251 ||  || — || April 10, 2005 || Kitt Peak || M. W. Buie || — || align=right | 4.0 km || 
|-id=252 bgcolor=#fefefe
| 374252 ||  || — || April 4, 2005 || Mount Lemmon || Mount Lemmon Survey || — || align=right data-sort-value="0.74" | 740 m || 
|-id=253 bgcolor=#d6d6d6
| 374253 ||  || — || April 10, 2005 || Mount Lemmon || Mount Lemmon Survey || — || align=right | 2.9 km || 
|-id=254 bgcolor=#d6d6d6
| 374254 ||  || — || April 6, 2005 || Kitt Peak || Spacewatch || EOS || align=right | 2.6 km || 
|-id=255 bgcolor=#fefefe
| 374255 ||  || — || April 30, 2005 || Kitt Peak || Spacewatch || V || align=right data-sort-value="0.61" | 610 m || 
|-id=256 bgcolor=#d6d6d6
| 374256 ||  || — || May 4, 2005 || Mauna Kea || C. Veillet || — || align=right | 3.5 km || 
|-id=257 bgcolor=#d6d6d6
| 374257 ||  || — || April 6, 2005 || Mount Lemmon || Mount Lemmon Survey || — || align=right | 3.7 km || 
|-id=258 bgcolor=#fefefe
| 374258 ||  || — || May 6, 2005 || Catalina || CSS || — || align=right | 1.3 km || 
|-id=259 bgcolor=#d6d6d6
| 374259 ||  || — || May 6, 2005 || Pla D'Arguines || Pla D'Arguines Obs. || EUP || align=right | 4.2 km || 
|-id=260 bgcolor=#fefefe
| 374260 ||  || — || May 4, 2005 || Kitt Peak || Spacewatch || — || align=right data-sort-value="0.75" | 750 m || 
|-id=261 bgcolor=#fefefe
| 374261 ||  || — || May 4, 2005 || Kitt Peak || Spacewatch || — || align=right data-sort-value="0.63" | 630 m || 
|-id=262 bgcolor=#d6d6d6
| 374262 ||  || — || May 10, 2005 || Mount Lemmon || Mount Lemmon Survey || — || align=right | 4.6 km || 
|-id=263 bgcolor=#fefefe
| 374263 ||  || — || April 14, 2005 || Catalina || CSS || — || align=right data-sort-value="0.83" | 830 m || 
|-id=264 bgcolor=#fefefe
| 374264 ||  || — || May 14, 2005 || Mount Lemmon || Mount Lemmon Survey || NYS || align=right data-sort-value="0.65" | 650 m || 
|-id=265 bgcolor=#fefefe
| 374265 ||  || — || May 8, 2005 || Kitt Peak || Spacewatch || NYS || align=right data-sort-value="0.74" | 740 m || 
|-id=266 bgcolor=#fefefe
| 374266 || 2005 LF || — || June 1, 2005 || La Silla || G. Bourban, R. Behrend || V || align=right data-sort-value="0.62" | 620 m || 
|-id=267 bgcolor=#FFC2E0
| 374267 ||  || — || June 2, 2005 || Socorro || LINEAR || APO || align=right data-sort-value="0.57" | 570 m || 
|-id=268 bgcolor=#fefefe
| 374268 ||  || — || June 12, 2005 || Kitt Peak || Spacewatch || MAS || align=right data-sort-value="0.75" | 750 m || 
|-id=269 bgcolor=#FA8072
| 374269 ||  || — || June 13, 2005 || Campo Imperatore || CINEOS || H || align=right data-sort-value="0.79" | 790 m || 
|-id=270 bgcolor=#fefefe
| 374270 ||  || — || June 29, 2005 || Palomar || NEAT || — || align=right | 1.0 km || 
|-id=271 bgcolor=#fefefe
| 374271 ||  || — || June 28, 2005 || Palomar || NEAT || — || align=right | 1.3 km || 
|-id=272 bgcolor=#fefefe
| 374272 ||  || — || July 4, 2005 || Mount Lemmon || Mount Lemmon Survey || — || align=right | 1.0 km || 
|-id=273 bgcolor=#fefefe
| 374273 ||  || — || July 1, 2005 || Kitt Peak || Spacewatch || V || align=right data-sort-value="0.83" | 830 m || 
|-id=274 bgcolor=#fefefe
| 374274 ||  || — || July 4, 2005 || Mount Lemmon || Mount Lemmon Survey || — || align=right | 1.0 km || 
|-id=275 bgcolor=#fefefe
| 374275 ||  || — || July 11, 2005 || Mayhill || A. Lowe || — || align=right | 1.1 km || 
|-id=276 bgcolor=#fefefe
| 374276 ||  || — || July 11, 2005 || Kitt Peak || Spacewatch || — || align=right | 1.2 km || 
|-id=277 bgcolor=#fefefe
| 374277 ||  || — || July 12, 2005 || Mount Lemmon || Mount Lemmon Survey || ERI || align=right | 1.5 km || 
|-id=278 bgcolor=#fefefe
| 374278 ||  || — || June 17, 2005 || Mount Lemmon || Mount Lemmon Survey || — || align=right data-sort-value="0.85" | 850 m || 
|-id=279 bgcolor=#fefefe
| 374279 ||  || — || July 30, 2005 || Palomar || NEAT || V || align=right data-sort-value="0.80" | 800 m || 
|-id=280 bgcolor=#fefefe
| 374280 ||  || — || August 4, 2005 || Palomar || NEAT || — || align=right data-sort-value="0.91" | 910 m || 
|-id=281 bgcolor=#fefefe
| 374281 ||  || — || August 12, 2005 || Kingsnake || J. V. McClusky || — || align=right data-sort-value="0.82" | 820 m || 
|-id=282 bgcolor=#fefefe
| 374282 ||  || — || August 25, 2005 || Palomar || NEAT || — || align=right data-sort-value="0.80" | 800 m || 
|-id=283 bgcolor=#d6d6d6
| 374283 ||  || — || August 26, 2005 || Palomar || NEAT || 3:2 || align=right | 4.9 km || 
|-id=284 bgcolor=#fefefe
| 374284 ||  || — || August 28, 2005 || Kitt Peak || Spacewatch || NYS || align=right data-sort-value="0.73" | 730 m || 
|-id=285 bgcolor=#fefefe
| 374285 ||  || — || August 26, 2005 || Palomar || NEAT || — || align=right data-sort-value="0.81" | 810 m || 
|-id=286 bgcolor=#fefefe
| 374286 ||  || — || August 29, 2005 || Anderson Mesa || LONEOS || — || align=right data-sort-value="0.98" | 980 m || 
|-id=287 bgcolor=#fefefe
| 374287 ||  || — || August 27, 2005 || Bergisch Gladbac || W. Bickel || — || align=right | 1.1 km || 
|-id=288 bgcolor=#d6d6d6
| 374288 ||  || — || August 29, 2005 || Kitt Peak || Spacewatch || 3:2 || align=right | 2.9 km || 
|-id=289 bgcolor=#fefefe
| 374289 ||  || — || August 27, 2005 || Palomar || NEAT || V || align=right data-sort-value="0.82" | 820 m || 
|-id=290 bgcolor=#fefefe
| 374290 ||  || — || August 28, 2005 || Kitt Peak || Spacewatch || — || align=right data-sort-value="0.74" | 740 m || 
|-id=291 bgcolor=#fefefe
| 374291 ||  || — || August 30, 2005 || Anderson Mesa || LONEOS || — || align=right data-sort-value="0.94" | 940 m || 
|-id=292 bgcolor=#fefefe
| 374292 ||  || — || September 2, 2005 || Palomar || NEAT || H || align=right data-sort-value="0.70" | 700 m || 
|-id=293 bgcolor=#d6d6d6
| 374293 ||  || — || September 26, 2005 || Kitt Peak || Spacewatch || SHU3:2 || align=right | 5.9 km || 
|-id=294 bgcolor=#fefefe
| 374294 ||  || — || September 23, 2005 || Kitt Peak || Spacewatch || — || align=right | 1.2 km || 
|-id=295 bgcolor=#fefefe
| 374295 ||  || — || September 24, 2005 || Kitt Peak || Spacewatch || MAS || align=right data-sort-value="0.87" | 870 m || 
|-id=296 bgcolor=#fefefe
| 374296 ||  || — || September 24, 2005 || Kitt Peak || Spacewatch || — || align=right | 1.1 km || 
|-id=297 bgcolor=#E9E9E9
| 374297 ||  || — || September 24, 2005 || Kitt Peak || Spacewatch || — || align=right data-sort-value="0.81" | 810 m || 
|-id=298 bgcolor=#E9E9E9
| 374298 ||  || — || September 26, 2005 || Kitt Peak || Spacewatch || — || align=right | 1.5 km || 
|-id=299 bgcolor=#fefefe
| 374299 ||  || — || September 24, 2005 || Kitt Peak || Spacewatch || NYS || align=right data-sort-value="0.65" | 650 m || 
|-id=300 bgcolor=#E9E9E9
| 374300 ||  || — || September 25, 2005 || Kitt Peak || Spacewatch || RAF || align=right data-sort-value="0.73" | 730 m || 
|}

374301–374400 

|-bgcolor=#E9E9E9
| 374301 ||  || — || September 25, 2005 || Kitt Peak || Spacewatch || — || align=right | 1.1 km || 
|-id=302 bgcolor=#E9E9E9
| 374302 ||  || — || September 25, 2005 || Kitt Peak || Spacewatch || — || align=right | 1.2 km || 
|-id=303 bgcolor=#E9E9E9
| 374303 ||  || — || September 25, 2005 || Kitt Peak || Spacewatch || — || align=right data-sort-value="0.74" | 740 m || 
|-id=304 bgcolor=#E9E9E9
| 374304 ||  || — || September 25, 2005 || Kitt Peak || Spacewatch || ADE || align=right | 2.1 km || 
|-id=305 bgcolor=#E9E9E9
| 374305 ||  || — || September 26, 2005 || Kitt Peak || Spacewatch || — || align=right data-sort-value="0.77" | 770 m || 
|-id=306 bgcolor=#fefefe
| 374306 ||  || — || September 26, 2005 || Catalina || CSS || H || align=right data-sort-value="0.65" | 650 m || 
|-id=307 bgcolor=#E9E9E9
| 374307 ||  || — || September 27, 2005 || Palomar || NEAT || — || align=right data-sort-value="0.85" | 850 m || 
|-id=308 bgcolor=#fefefe
| 374308 ||  || — || September 29, 2005 || Kitt Peak || Spacewatch || — || align=right data-sort-value="0.91" | 910 m || 
|-id=309 bgcolor=#E9E9E9
| 374309 ||  || — || September 29, 2005 || Mount Lemmon || Mount Lemmon Survey || KON || align=right | 2.2 km || 
|-id=310 bgcolor=#fefefe
| 374310 ||  || — || September 30, 2005 || Mount Lemmon || Mount Lemmon Survey || H || align=right data-sort-value="0.44" | 440 m || 
|-id=311 bgcolor=#E9E9E9
| 374311 ||  || — || September 30, 2005 || Mount Lemmon || Mount Lemmon Survey || — || align=right data-sort-value="0.69" | 690 m || 
|-id=312 bgcolor=#E9E9E9
| 374312 ||  || — || September 30, 2005 || Kitt Peak || Spacewatch || — || align=right data-sort-value="0.73" | 730 m || 
|-id=313 bgcolor=#E9E9E9
| 374313 ||  || — || September 14, 2005 || Kitt Peak || Spacewatch || — || align=right data-sort-value="0.74" | 740 m || 
|-id=314 bgcolor=#E9E9E9
| 374314 ||  || — || September 29, 2005 || Kitt Peak || Spacewatch || — || align=right | 1.1 km || 
|-id=315 bgcolor=#E9E9E9
| 374315 ||  || — || September 30, 2005 || Kitt Peak || Spacewatch || — || align=right | 1.1 km || 
|-id=316 bgcolor=#E9E9E9
| 374316 ||  || — || September 25, 2005 || Catalina || CSS || — || align=right data-sort-value="0.95" | 950 m || 
|-id=317 bgcolor=#E9E9E9
| 374317 ||  || — || September 30, 2005 || Mount Lemmon || Mount Lemmon Survey || — || align=right data-sort-value="0.94" | 940 m || 
|-id=318 bgcolor=#d6d6d6
| 374318 ||  || — || September 13, 2005 || Kitt Peak || Spacewatch || 3:2 || align=right | 3.9 km || 
|-id=319 bgcolor=#E9E9E9
| 374319 ||  || — || October 1, 2005 || Catalina || CSS || — || align=right data-sort-value="0.94" | 940 m || 
|-id=320 bgcolor=#E9E9E9
| 374320 ||  || — || October 1, 2005 || Catalina || CSS || — || align=right | 2.2 km || 
|-id=321 bgcolor=#fefefe
| 374321 ||  || — || October 1, 2005 || Socorro || LINEAR || — || align=right | 1.4 km || 
|-id=322 bgcolor=#E9E9E9
| 374322 ||  || — || October 1, 2005 || Mount Lemmon || Mount Lemmon Survey || — || align=right data-sort-value="0.86" | 860 m || 
|-id=323 bgcolor=#E9E9E9
| 374323 ||  || — || October 1, 2005 || Mount Lemmon || Mount Lemmon Survey || — || align=right data-sort-value="0.76" | 760 m || 
|-id=324 bgcolor=#E9E9E9
| 374324 ||  || — || October 2, 2005 || Mount Lemmon || Mount Lemmon Survey || — || align=right | 1.00 km || 
|-id=325 bgcolor=#E9E9E9
| 374325 ||  || — || October 4, 2005 || Mount Lemmon || Mount Lemmon Survey || — || align=right data-sort-value="0.89" | 890 m || 
|-id=326 bgcolor=#E9E9E9
| 374326 ||  || — || October 6, 2005 || Mount Lemmon || Mount Lemmon Survey || — || align=right data-sort-value="0.75" | 750 m || 
|-id=327 bgcolor=#E9E9E9
| 374327 ||  || — || October 6, 2005 || Kitt Peak || Spacewatch || — || align=right data-sort-value="0.81" | 810 m || 
|-id=328 bgcolor=#E9E9E9
| 374328 ||  || — || October 3, 2005 || Kitt Peak || Spacewatch || — || align=right data-sort-value="0.68" | 680 m || 
|-id=329 bgcolor=#fefefe
| 374329 ||  || — || September 24, 2005 || Kitt Peak || Spacewatch || — || align=right data-sort-value="0.75" | 750 m || 
|-id=330 bgcolor=#E9E9E9
| 374330 ||  || — || October 7, 2005 || Kitt Peak || Spacewatch || — || align=right | 1.6 km || 
|-id=331 bgcolor=#d6d6d6
| 374331 ||  || — || September 26, 2005 || Kitt Peak || Spacewatch || SHU3:2 || align=right | 6.7 km || 
|-id=332 bgcolor=#fefefe
| 374332 ||  || — || October 7, 2005 || Kitt Peak || Spacewatch || — || align=right | 1.3 km || 
|-id=333 bgcolor=#E9E9E9
| 374333 ||  || — || October 7, 2005 || Kitt Peak || Spacewatch || — || align=right | 1.2 km || 
|-id=334 bgcolor=#d6d6d6
| 374334 ||  || — || October 7, 2005 || Kitt Peak || Spacewatch || — || align=right | 2.3 km || 
|-id=335 bgcolor=#E9E9E9
| 374335 ||  || — || October 5, 2005 || Kitt Peak || Spacewatch || — || align=right data-sort-value="0.80" | 800 m || 
|-id=336 bgcolor=#E9E9E9
| 374336 ||  || — || October 10, 2005 || Anderson Mesa || LONEOS || — || align=right | 1.4 km || 
|-id=337 bgcolor=#fefefe
| 374337 ||  || — || October 7, 2005 || Anderson Mesa || LONEOS || H || align=right data-sort-value="0.80" | 800 m || 
|-id=338 bgcolor=#E9E9E9
| 374338 Fontana ||  ||  || October 25, 2005 || Vallemare di Borbona || V. S. Casulli || — || align=right | 1.0 km || 
|-id=339 bgcolor=#fefefe
| 374339 ||  || — || October 28, 2005 || Socorro || LINEAR || H || align=right data-sort-value="0.71" | 710 m || 
|-id=340 bgcolor=#E9E9E9
| 374340 ||  || — || October 22, 2005 || Kitt Peak || Spacewatch || — || align=right data-sort-value="0.95" | 950 m || 
|-id=341 bgcolor=#E9E9E9
| 374341 ||  || — || October 24, 2005 || Kitt Peak || Spacewatch || — || align=right data-sort-value="0.80" | 800 m || 
|-id=342 bgcolor=#E9E9E9
| 374342 ||  || — || October 25, 2005 || Mount Lemmon || Mount Lemmon Survey || — || align=right | 1.2 km || 
|-id=343 bgcolor=#E9E9E9
| 374343 ||  || — || October 23, 2005 || Palomar || NEAT || HNS || align=right | 1.4 km || 
|-id=344 bgcolor=#E9E9E9
| 374344 ||  || — || October 22, 2005 || Kitt Peak || Spacewatch || — || align=right data-sort-value="0.93" | 930 m || 
|-id=345 bgcolor=#E9E9E9
| 374345 ||  || — || October 22, 2005 || Kitt Peak || Spacewatch || — || align=right data-sort-value="0.72" | 720 m || 
|-id=346 bgcolor=#E9E9E9
| 374346 ||  || — || October 22, 2005 || Kitt Peak || Spacewatch || — || align=right | 1.1 km || 
|-id=347 bgcolor=#E9E9E9
| 374347 ||  || — || October 24, 2005 || Kitt Peak || Spacewatch || — || align=right | 1.5 km || 
|-id=348 bgcolor=#E9E9E9
| 374348 ||  || — || October 24, 2005 || Palomar || NEAT || — || align=right | 1.3 km || 
|-id=349 bgcolor=#E9E9E9
| 374349 ||  || — || October 26, 2005 || Kitt Peak || Spacewatch || — || align=right data-sort-value="0.81" | 810 m || 
|-id=350 bgcolor=#E9E9E9
| 374350 ||  || — || October 26, 2005 || Kitt Peak || Spacewatch || — || align=right | 3.5 km || 
|-id=351 bgcolor=#E9E9E9
| 374351 ||  || — || October 26, 2005 || Palomar || NEAT || — || align=right data-sort-value="0.90" | 900 m || 
|-id=352 bgcolor=#fefefe
| 374352 ||  || — || October 31, 2005 || Socorro || LINEAR || H || align=right data-sort-value="0.91" | 910 m || 
|-id=353 bgcolor=#E9E9E9
| 374353 ||  || — || October 28, 2005 || Junk Bond || D. Healy || EUN || align=right | 1.3 km || 
|-id=354 bgcolor=#E9E9E9
| 374354 Pesquet ||  ||  || October 30, 2005 || Nogales || J.-C. Merlin || — || align=right | 1.2 km || 
|-id=355 bgcolor=#E9E9E9
| 374355 ||  || — || October 24, 2005 || Kitt Peak || Spacewatch || RAF || align=right data-sort-value="0.82" | 820 m || 
|-id=356 bgcolor=#E9E9E9
| 374356 ||  || — || October 24, 2005 || Kitt Peak || Spacewatch || — || align=right | 1.9 km || 
|-id=357 bgcolor=#E9E9E9
| 374357 ||  || — || October 24, 2005 || Kitt Peak || Spacewatch || — || align=right | 1.4 km || 
|-id=358 bgcolor=#E9E9E9
| 374358 ||  || — || October 25, 2005 || Kitt Peak || Spacewatch || — || align=right data-sort-value="0.96" | 960 m || 
|-id=359 bgcolor=#E9E9E9
| 374359 ||  || — || October 25, 2005 || Kitt Peak || Spacewatch || — || align=right | 1.1 km || 
|-id=360 bgcolor=#E9E9E9
| 374360 ||  || — || October 27, 2005 || Kitt Peak || Spacewatch || — || align=right | 3.9 km || 
|-id=361 bgcolor=#E9E9E9
| 374361 ||  || — || October 22, 2005 || Kitt Peak || Spacewatch || — || align=right | 1.6 km || 
|-id=362 bgcolor=#E9E9E9
| 374362 ||  || — || October 25, 2005 || Mount Lemmon || Mount Lemmon Survey || — || align=right data-sort-value="0.98" | 980 m || 
|-id=363 bgcolor=#E9E9E9
| 374363 ||  || — || October 25, 2005 || Kitt Peak || Spacewatch || — || align=right | 2.2 km || 
|-id=364 bgcolor=#E9E9E9
| 374364 ||  || — || October 25, 2005 || Kitt Peak || Spacewatch || — || align=right | 1.5 km || 
|-id=365 bgcolor=#E9E9E9
| 374365 ||  || — || October 26, 2005 || Kitt Peak || Spacewatch || — || align=right | 2.3 km || 
|-id=366 bgcolor=#E9E9E9
| 374366 ||  || — || October 26, 2005 || Kitt Peak || Spacewatch || — || align=right | 1.2 km || 
|-id=367 bgcolor=#E9E9E9
| 374367 ||  || — || October 26, 2005 || Kitt Peak || Spacewatch || — || align=right data-sort-value="0.70" | 700 m || 
|-id=368 bgcolor=#E9E9E9
| 374368 ||  || — || October 26, 2005 || Kitt Peak || Spacewatch || — || align=right | 1.2 km || 
|-id=369 bgcolor=#E9E9E9
| 374369 ||  || — || October 29, 2005 || Mount Lemmon || Mount Lemmon Survey || — || align=right | 1.4 km || 
|-id=370 bgcolor=#E9E9E9
| 374370 ||  || — || October 28, 2005 || Catalina || CSS || — || align=right data-sort-value="0.85" | 850 m || 
|-id=371 bgcolor=#E9E9E9
| 374371 ||  || — || October 29, 2005 || Mount Lemmon || Mount Lemmon Survey || — || align=right data-sort-value="0.84" | 840 m || 
|-id=372 bgcolor=#E9E9E9
| 374372 ||  || — || October 29, 2005 || Kitt Peak || Spacewatch || — || align=right data-sort-value="0.98" | 980 m || 
|-id=373 bgcolor=#E9E9E9
| 374373 ||  || — || October 27, 2005 || Kitt Peak || Spacewatch || — || align=right | 1.1 km || 
|-id=374 bgcolor=#E9E9E9
| 374374 ||  || — || October 27, 2005 || Kitt Peak || Spacewatch || EUN || align=right | 1.1 km || 
|-id=375 bgcolor=#E9E9E9
| 374375 ||  || — || October 27, 2005 || Kitt Peak || Spacewatch || — || align=right data-sort-value="0.86" | 860 m || 
|-id=376 bgcolor=#E9E9E9
| 374376 ||  || — || October 27, 2005 || Kitt Peak || Spacewatch || — || align=right | 1.9 km || 
|-id=377 bgcolor=#E9E9E9
| 374377 ||  || — || October 30, 2005 || Mount Lemmon || Mount Lemmon Survey || EUN || align=right | 1.0 km || 
|-id=378 bgcolor=#E9E9E9
| 374378 ||  || — || October 26, 2005 || Kitt Peak || Spacewatch || — || align=right | 1.5 km || 
|-id=379 bgcolor=#E9E9E9
| 374379 ||  || — || October 29, 2005 || Mount Lemmon || Mount Lemmon Survey || — || align=right data-sort-value="0.91" | 910 m || 
|-id=380 bgcolor=#E9E9E9
| 374380 ||  || — || October 28, 2005 || Kitt Peak || Spacewatch || — || align=right data-sort-value="0.58" | 580 m || 
|-id=381 bgcolor=#E9E9E9
| 374381 ||  || — || October 28, 2005 || Kitt Peak || Spacewatch || HEN || align=right data-sort-value="0.85" | 850 m || 
|-id=382 bgcolor=#d6d6d6
| 374382 ||  || — || October 29, 2005 || Kitt Peak || Spacewatch || HIL3:2 || align=right | 5.6 km || 
|-id=383 bgcolor=#E9E9E9
| 374383 ||  || — || October 30, 2005 || Socorro || LINEAR || — || align=right | 1.6 km || 
|-id=384 bgcolor=#E9E9E9
| 374384 ||  || — || October 30, 2005 || Kitt Peak || Spacewatch || MAR || align=right | 1.4 km || 
|-id=385 bgcolor=#E9E9E9
| 374385 ||  || — || October 24, 2005 || Kitt Peak || Spacewatch || — || align=right | 1.3 km || 
|-id=386 bgcolor=#E9E9E9
| 374386 ||  || — || October 27, 2005 || Mount Lemmon || Mount Lemmon Survey || — || align=right | 1.1 km || 
|-id=387 bgcolor=#E9E9E9
| 374387 ||  || — || October 29, 2005 || Catalina || CSS || BRG || align=right | 1.3 km || 
|-id=388 bgcolor=#E9E9E9
| 374388 ||  || — || October 31, 2005 || Palomar || NEAT || — || align=right | 1.1 km || 
|-id=389 bgcolor=#fefefe
| 374389 ||  || — || October 26, 2005 || Apache Point || A. C. Becker || — || align=right data-sort-value="0.70" | 700 m || 
|-id=390 bgcolor=#E9E9E9
| 374390 ||  || — || October 25, 2005 || Catalina || CSS || — || align=right | 2.7 km || 
|-id=391 bgcolor=#E9E9E9
| 374391 ||  || — || October 31, 2005 || Mount Lemmon || Mount Lemmon Survey || — || align=right | 2.6 km || 
|-id=392 bgcolor=#E9E9E9
| 374392 ||  || — || November 3, 2005 || Mount Lemmon || Mount Lemmon Survey || — || align=right data-sort-value="0.91" | 910 m || 
|-id=393 bgcolor=#E9E9E9
| 374393 ||  || — || November 3, 2005 || Catalina || CSS || — || align=right data-sort-value="0.87" | 870 m || 
|-id=394 bgcolor=#E9E9E9
| 374394 ||  || — || November 3, 2005 || Mount Lemmon || Mount Lemmon Survey || — || align=right data-sort-value="0.81" | 810 m || 
|-id=395 bgcolor=#E9E9E9
| 374395 ||  || — || November 4, 2005 || Mount Lemmon || Mount Lemmon Survey || — || align=right | 1.5 km || 
|-id=396 bgcolor=#E9E9E9
| 374396 ||  || — || November 5, 2005 || Kitt Peak || Spacewatch || — || align=right data-sort-value="0.85" | 850 m || 
|-id=397 bgcolor=#E9E9E9
| 374397 ||  || — || November 5, 2005 || Kitt Peak || Spacewatch || — || align=right | 1.2 km || 
|-id=398 bgcolor=#E9E9E9
| 374398 ||  || — || November 3, 2005 || Mount Lemmon || Mount Lemmon Survey || — || align=right data-sort-value="0.86" | 860 m || 
|-id=399 bgcolor=#E9E9E9
| 374399 ||  || — || November 5, 2005 || Kitt Peak || Spacewatch || — || align=right data-sort-value="0.89" | 890 m || 
|-id=400 bgcolor=#E9E9E9
| 374400 ||  || — || November 5, 2005 || Catalina || CSS || — || align=right | 3.8 km || 
|}

374401–374500 

|-bgcolor=#E9E9E9
| 374401 ||  || — || October 25, 2005 || Kitt Peak || Spacewatch || — || align=right | 1.1 km || 
|-id=402 bgcolor=#E9E9E9
| 374402 ||  || — || November 1, 2005 || Apache Point || A. C. Becker || — || align=right data-sort-value="0.64" | 640 m || 
|-id=403 bgcolor=#E9E9E9
| 374403 ||  || — || October 22, 2005 || Catalina || CSS || — || align=right | 1.1 km || 
|-id=404 bgcolor=#E9E9E9
| 374404 || 2005 WM || — || November 20, 2005 || Wrightwood || J. W. Young || — || align=right | 1.8 km || 
|-id=405 bgcolor=#E9E9E9
| 374405 ||  || — || November 21, 2005 || Anderson Mesa || LONEOS || — || align=right | 1.6 km || 
|-id=406 bgcolor=#E9E9E9
| 374406 ||  || — || November 21, 2005 || Kitt Peak || Spacewatch || — || align=right | 1.6 km || 
|-id=407 bgcolor=#E9E9E9
| 374407 ||  || — || November 21, 2005 || Kitt Peak || Spacewatch || — || align=right | 2.1 km || 
|-id=408 bgcolor=#E9E9E9
| 374408 ||  || — || November 21, 2005 || Kitt Peak || Spacewatch || — || align=right | 1.0 km || 
|-id=409 bgcolor=#E9E9E9
| 374409 ||  || — || November 21, 2005 || Catalina || CSS || — || align=right | 1.2 km || 
|-id=410 bgcolor=#E9E9E9
| 374410 ||  || — || November 25, 2005 || Mount Lemmon || Mount Lemmon Survey || — || align=right | 2.4 km || 
|-id=411 bgcolor=#E9E9E9
| 374411 ||  || — || November 22, 2005 || Kitt Peak || Spacewatch || — || align=right data-sort-value="0.90" | 900 m || 
|-id=412 bgcolor=#E9E9E9
| 374412 ||  || — || November 25, 2005 || Kitt Peak || Spacewatch || — || align=right | 1.9 km || 
|-id=413 bgcolor=#E9E9E9
| 374413 ||  || — || November 25, 2005 || Mount Lemmon || Mount Lemmon Survey || — || align=right | 1.2 km || 
|-id=414 bgcolor=#E9E9E9
| 374414 ||  || — || November 25, 2005 || Mount Lemmon || Mount Lemmon Survey || — || align=right | 1.3 km || 
|-id=415 bgcolor=#E9E9E9
| 374415 ||  || — || November 25, 2005 || Mount Lemmon || Mount Lemmon Survey || — || align=right | 1.4 km || 
|-id=416 bgcolor=#E9E9E9
| 374416 ||  || — || November 25, 2005 || Catalina || CSS || — || align=right | 1.0 km || 
|-id=417 bgcolor=#E9E9E9
| 374417 ||  || — || November 25, 2005 || Catalina || CSS || — || align=right | 1.0 km || 
|-id=418 bgcolor=#E9E9E9
| 374418 ||  || — || November 22, 2005 || Kitt Peak || Spacewatch || — || align=right | 1.5 km || 
|-id=419 bgcolor=#E9E9E9
| 374419 ||  || — || November 25, 2005 || Mount Lemmon || Mount Lemmon Survey || — || align=right | 2.9 km || 
|-id=420 bgcolor=#E9E9E9
| 374420 ||  || — || November 26, 2005 || Kitt Peak || Spacewatch || — || align=right | 1.3 km || 
|-id=421 bgcolor=#fefefe
| 374421 ||  || — || November 26, 2005 || Catalina || CSS || H || align=right | 1.3 km || 
|-id=422 bgcolor=#E9E9E9
| 374422 ||  || — || November 28, 2005 || Mount Lemmon || Mount Lemmon Survey || RAF || align=right data-sort-value="0.73" | 730 m || 
|-id=423 bgcolor=#E9E9E9
| 374423 ||  || — || November 30, 2005 || Kitt Peak || Spacewatch || — || align=right data-sort-value="0.93" | 930 m || 
|-id=424 bgcolor=#E9E9E9
| 374424 ||  || — || November 30, 2005 || Kitt Peak || Spacewatch || — || align=right | 1.4 km || 
|-id=425 bgcolor=#E9E9E9
| 374425 ||  || — || November 25, 2005 || Catalina || CSS || — || align=right data-sort-value="0.90" | 900 m || 
|-id=426 bgcolor=#E9E9E9
| 374426 ||  || — || November 30, 2005 || Socorro || LINEAR || — || align=right | 1.4 km || 
|-id=427 bgcolor=#E9E9E9
| 374427 ||  || — || November 30, 2005 || Mount Lemmon || Mount Lemmon Survey || — || align=right | 2.6 km || 
|-id=428 bgcolor=#E9E9E9
| 374428 ||  || — || November 25, 2005 || Catalina || CSS || — || align=right | 1.1 km || 
|-id=429 bgcolor=#E9E9E9
| 374429 ||  || — || November 3, 2005 || Kitt Peak || Spacewatch || — || align=right data-sort-value="0.89" | 890 m || 
|-id=430 bgcolor=#E9E9E9
| 374430 ||  || — || November 29, 2005 || Kitt Peak || Spacewatch || — || align=right | 1.1 km || 
|-id=431 bgcolor=#E9E9E9
| 374431 ||  || — || November 28, 2005 || Socorro || LINEAR || — || align=right | 1.1 km || 
|-id=432 bgcolor=#E9E9E9
| 374432 ||  || — || November 29, 2005 || Kitt Peak || Spacewatch || — || align=right | 1.0 km || 
|-id=433 bgcolor=#E9E9E9
| 374433 ||  || — || November 29, 2005 || Mount Lemmon || Mount Lemmon Survey || — || align=right | 2.4 km || 
|-id=434 bgcolor=#E9E9E9
| 374434 ||  || — || November 28, 2005 || Palomar || NEAT || — || align=right | 1.3 km || 
|-id=435 bgcolor=#d6d6d6
| 374435 ||  || — || November 29, 2005 || Mount Lemmon || Mount Lemmon Survey || 3:2 || align=right | 5.7 km || 
|-id=436 bgcolor=#E9E9E9
| 374436 ||  || — || November 29, 2005 || Mount Lemmon || Mount Lemmon Survey || MIS || align=right | 3.2 km || 
|-id=437 bgcolor=#E9E9E9
| 374437 ||  || — || November 30, 2005 || Kitt Peak || Spacewatch || — || align=right | 1.3 km || 
|-id=438 bgcolor=#E9E9E9
| 374438 ||  || — || November 30, 2005 || Kitt Peak || Spacewatch || EUN || align=right | 1.8 km || 
|-id=439 bgcolor=#E9E9E9
| 374439 ||  || — || November 30, 2005 || Kitt Peak || Spacewatch || — || align=right data-sort-value="0.84" | 840 m || 
|-id=440 bgcolor=#E9E9E9
| 374440 ||  || — || November 30, 2005 || Kitt Peak || Spacewatch || NEM || align=right | 2.4 km || 
|-id=441 bgcolor=#fefefe
| 374441 ||  || — || November 29, 2005 || Socorro || LINEAR || H || align=right data-sort-value="0.68" | 680 m || 
|-id=442 bgcolor=#E9E9E9
| 374442 ||  || — || November 29, 2005 || Kitt Peak || Spacewatch || — || align=right data-sort-value="0.83" | 830 m || 
|-id=443 bgcolor=#E9E9E9
| 374443 ||  || — || November 30, 2005 || Kitt Peak || Spacewatch || — || align=right | 2.1 km || 
|-id=444 bgcolor=#E9E9E9
| 374444 ||  || — || November 28, 2005 || Socorro || LINEAR || — || align=right | 1.3 km || 
|-id=445 bgcolor=#E9E9E9
| 374445 ||  || — || November 25, 2005 || Mount Lemmon || Mount Lemmon Survey || — || align=right | 1.8 km || 
|-id=446 bgcolor=#E9E9E9
| 374446 ||  || — || November 21, 2005 || Catalina || CSS || — || align=right | 1.8 km || 
|-id=447 bgcolor=#E9E9E9
| 374447 ||  || — || November 28, 2005 || Kitt Peak || Spacewatch || — || align=right | 1.0 km || 
|-id=448 bgcolor=#E9E9E9
| 374448 ||  || — || November 30, 2005 || Kitt Peak || Spacewatch || — || align=right | 1.2 km || 
|-id=449 bgcolor=#FFC2E0
| 374449 ||  || — || December 4, 2005 || Catalina || CSS || AMO || align=right data-sort-value="0.41" | 410 m || 
|-id=450 bgcolor=#E9E9E9
| 374450 ||  || — || November 6, 2005 || Mount Lemmon || Mount Lemmon Survey || MAR || align=right | 1.4 km || 
|-id=451 bgcolor=#E9E9E9
| 374451 ||  || — || December 1, 2005 || Mount Lemmon || Mount Lemmon Survey || — || align=right | 1.4 km || 
|-id=452 bgcolor=#fefefe
| 374452 ||  || — || December 1, 2005 || Anderson Mesa || LONEOS || H || align=right data-sort-value="0.88" | 880 m || 
|-id=453 bgcolor=#d6d6d6
| 374453 ||  || — || December 1, 2005 || Kitt Peak || Spacewatch || SHU3:2 || align=right | 5.7 km || 
|-id=454 bgcolor=#E9E9E9
| 374454 ||  || — || December 1, 2005 || Kitt Peak || Spacewatch || — || align=right | 1.9 km || 
|-id=455 bgcolor=#E9E9E9
| 374455 ||  || — || December 1, 2005 || Mount Lemmon || Mount Lemmon Survey || EUN || align=right | 1.8 km || 
|-id=456 bgcolor=#E9E9E9
| 374456 ||  || — || December 4, 2005 || Mount Lemmon || Mount Lemmon Survey || — || align=right | 1.4 km || 
|-id=457 bgcolor=#E9E9E9
| 374457 ||  || — || December 1, 2005 || Socorro || LINEAR || — || align=right | 1.2 km || 
|-id=458 bgcolor=#E9E9E9
| 374458 ||  || — || December 2, 2005 || Catalina || CSS || ADE || align=right | 2.4 km || 
|-id=459 bgcolor=#E9E9E9
| 374459 ||  || — || December 4, 2005 || Kitt Peak || Spacewatch || — || align=right | 1.3 km || 
|-id=460 bgcolor=#E9E9E9
| 374460 ||  || — || December 2, 2005 || Kitt Peak || Spacewatch || — || align=right data-sort-value="0.86" | 860 m || 
|-id=461 bgcolor=#E9E9E9
| 374461 ||  || — || December 2, 2005 || Kitt Peak || Spacewatch || — || align=right | 1.4 km || 
|-id=462 bgcolor=#E9E9E9
| 374462 ||  || — || December 4, 2005 || Kitt Peak || Spacewatch || — || align=right | 1.1 km || 
|-id=463 bgcolor=#E9E9E9
| 374463 ||  || — || December 5, 2005 || Kitt Peak || Spacewatch || MIS || align=right | 2.4 km || 
|-id=464 bgcolor=#E9E9E9
| 374464 ||  || — || December 3, 2005 || Kitt Peak || Spacewatch || — || align=right | 1.5 km || 
|-id=465 bgcolor=#E9E9E9
| 374465 ||  || — || December 6, 2005 || Socorro || LINEAR || JUN || align=right | 1.3 km || 
|-id=466 bgcolor=#E9E9E9
| 374466 ||  || — || November 28, 2005 || Kitt Peak || Spacewatch || — || align=right | 1.9 km || 
|-id=467 bgcolor=#E9E9E9
| 374467 ||  || — || December 10, 2005 || Kitt Peak || Spacewatch || — || align=right | 1.0 km || 
|-id=468 bgcolor=#E9E9E9
| 374468 ||  || — || December 2, 2005 || Socorro || LINEAR || — || align=right data-sort-value="0.98" | 980 m || 
|-id=469 bgcolor=#E9E9E9
| 374469 ||  || — || December 6, 2005 || Anderson Mesa || LONEOS || ADE || align=right | 3.8 km || 
|-id=470 bgcolor=#E9E9E9
| 374470 ||  || — || September 11, 2004 || Kitt Peak || Spacewatch || — || align=right | 1.2 km || 
|-id=471 bgcolor=#E9E9E9
| 374471 ||  || — || December 21, 2005 || Kitt Peak || Spacewatch || — || align=right | 1.8 km || 
|-id=472 bgcolor=#E9E9E9
| 374472 ||  || — || December 22, 2005 || Kitt Peak || Spacewatch || — || align=right | 2.1 km || 
|-id=473 bgcolor=#E9E9E9
| 374473 ||  || — || December 24, 2005 || Kitt Peak || Spacewatch || — || align=right | 1.1 km || 
|-id=474 bgcolor=#E9E9E9
| 374474 ||  || — || December 21, 2005 || Kitt Peak || Spacewatch || — || align=right data-sort-value="0.91" | 910 m || 
|-id=475 bgcolor=#E9E9E9
| 374475 ||  || — || December 22, 2005 || Kitt Peak || Spacewatch || — || align=right | 1.7 km || 
|-id=476 bgcolor=#E9E9E9
| 374476 ||  || — || December 24, 2005 || Kitt Peak || Spacewatch || — || align=right | 2.1 km || 
|-id=477 bgcolor=#E9E9E9
| 374477 ||  || — || December 25, 2005 || Anderson Mesa || LONEOS || — || align=right | 1.6 km || 
|-id=478 bgcolor=#E9E9E9
| 374478 ||  || — || December 22, 2005 || Kitt Peak || Spacewatch || — || align=right | 3.3 km || 
|-id=479 bgcolor=#E9E9E9
| 374479 ||  || — || December 25, 2005 || Kitt Peak || Spacewatch || ADE || align=right | 2.2 km || 
|-id=480 bgcolor=#E9E9E9
| 374480 ||  || — || December 25, 2005 || Kitt Peak || Spacewatch || AER || align=right | 1.7 km || 
|-id=481 bgcolor=#E9E9E9
| 374481 ||  || — || December 25, 2005 || Mount Lemmon || Mount Lemmon Survey || WIT || align=right | 1.3 km || 
|-id=482 bgcolor=#E9E9E9
| 374482 ||  || — || December 27, 2005 || Siding Spring || SSS || — || align=right | 1.3 km || 
|-id=483 bgcolor=#E9E9E9
| 374483 ||  || — || December 24, 2005 || Kitt Peak || Spacewatch || WIT || align=right data-sort-value="0.93" | 930 m || 
|-id=484 bgcolor=#E9E9E9
| 374484 ||  || — || December 26, 2005 || Kitt Peak || Spacewatch || — || align=right | 2.4 km || 
|-id=485 bgcolor=#E9E9E9
| 374485 ||  || — || December 24, 2005 || Kitt Peak || Spacewatch || — || align=right data-sort-value="0.65" | 650 m || 
|-id=486 bgcolor=#E9E9E9
| 374486 ||  || — || December 24, 2005 || Kitt Peak || Spacewatch || — || align=right | 1.3 km || 
|-id=487 bgcolor=#E9E9E9
| 374487 ||  || — || December 26, 2005 || Mount Lemmon || Mount Lemmon Survey || WIT || align=right | 1.1 km || 
|-id=488 bgcolor=#E9E9E9
| 374488 ||  || — || December 26, 2005 || Mount Lemmon || Mount Lemmon Survey || — || align=right | 2.6 km || 
|-id=489 bgcolor=#E9E9E9
| 374489 ||  || — || December 27, 2005 || Kitt Peak || Spacewatch || — || align=right | 2.0 km || 
|-id=490 bgcolor=#E9E9E9
| 374490 ||  || — || December 25, 2005 || Kitt Peak || Spacewatch || — || align=right | 1.5 km || 
|-id=491 bgcolor=#E9E9E9
| 374491 ||  || — || December 25, 2005 || Kitt Peak || Spacewatch || — || align=right | 1.2 km || 
|-id=492 bgcolor=#E9E9E9
| 374492 ||  || — || December 24, 2005 || Kitt Peak || Spacewatch || — || align=right | 1.9 km || 
|-id=493 bgcolor=#E9E9E9
| 374493 ||  || — || December 25, 2005 || Kitt Peak || Spacewatch || — || align=right data-sort-value="0.89" | 890 m || 
|-id=494 bgcolor=#E9E9E9
| 374494 ||  || — || December 25, 2005 || Kitt Peak || Spacewatch || — || align=right data-sort-value="0.80" | 800 m || 
|-id=495 bgcolor=#E9E9E9
| 374495 ||  || — || December 25, 2005 || Mount Lemmon || Mount Lemmon Survey || — || align=right | 1.4 km || 
|-id=496 bgcolor=#E9E9E9
| 374496 ||  || — || December 25, 2005 || Kitt Peak || Spacewatch || — || align=right | 1.4 km || 
|-id=497 bgcolor=#E9E9E9
| 374497 ||  || — || December 25, 2005 || Kitt Peak || Spacewatch || — || align=right | 1.2 km || 
|-id=498 bgcolor=#E9E9E9
| 374498 ||  || — || December 26, 2005 || Kitt Peak || Spacewatch || — || align=right | 2.2 km || 
|-id=499 bgcolor=#E9E9E9
| 374499 ||  || — || December 29, 2005 || Socorro || LINEAR || — || align=right | 1.4 km || 
|-id=500 bgcolor=#E9E9E9
| 374500 ||  || — || December 29, 2005 || Mount Lemmon || Mount Lemmon Survey || — || align=right | 2.5 km || 
|}

374501–374600 

|-bgcolor=#E9E9E9
| 374501 ||  || — || December 29, 2005 || Socorro || LINEAR || — || align=right | 1.2 km || 
|-id=502 bgcolor=#E9E9E9
| 374502 ||  || — || December 29, 2005 || Socorro || LINEAR || — || align=right | 1.0 km || 
|-id=503 bgcolor=#E9E9E9
| 374503 ||  || — || December 29, 2005 || Socorro || LINEAR || MAR || align=right | 1.3 km || 
|-id=504 bgcolor=#E9E9E9
| 374504 ||  || — || December 29, 2005 || Palomar || NEAT || — || align=right | 2.7 km || 
|-id=505 bgcolor=#E9E9E9
| 374505 ||  || — || December 28, 2005 || Mount Lemmon || Mount Lemmon Survey || — || align=right | 2.7 km || 
|-id=506 bgcolor=#E9E9E9
| 374506 ||  || — || December 29, 2005 || Kitt Peak || Spacewatch || WIT || align=right | 1.1 km || 
|-id=507 bgcolor=#E9E9E9
| 374507 ||  || — || December 22, 2005 || Catalina || CSS || HNS || align=right | 2.6 km || 
|-id=508 bgcolor=#E9E9E9
| 374508 ||  || — || December 22, 2005 || Kitt Peak || Spacewatch || — || align=right | 1.9 km || 
|-id=509 bgcolor=#E9E9E9
| 374509 ||  || — || December 25, 2005 || Mount Lemmon || Mount Lemmon Survey || WIT || align=right | 1.00 km || 
|-id=510 bgcolor=#E9E9E9
| 374510 ||  || — || December 26, 2005 || Kitt Peak || Spacewatch || — || align=right | 1.6 km || 
|-id=511 bgcolor=#E9E9E9
| 374511 ||  || — || December 26, 2005 || Kitt Peak || Spacewatch || — || align=right | 1.7 km || 
|-id=512 bgcolor=#E9E9E9
| 374512 ||  || — || December 31, 2005 || Kitt Peak || Spacewatch || — || align=right | 1.9 km || 
|-id=513 bgcolor=#E9E9E9
| 374513 ||  || — || December 28, 2005 || Kitt Peak || Spacewatch || — || align=right | 2.0 km || 
|-id=514 bgcolor=#E9E9E9
| 374514 ||  || — || December 28, 2005 || Kitt Peak || Spacewatch || MAR || align=right | 1.6 km || 
|-id=515 bgcolor=#E9E9E9
| 374515 ||  || — || December 30, 2005 || Mount Lemmon || Mount Lemmon Survey || — || align=right | 2.5 km || 
|-id=516 bgcolor=#E9E9E9
| 374516 ||  || — || December 28, 2005 || Kitt Peak || Spacewatch || — || align=right | 2.5 km || 
|-id=517 bgcolor=#E9E9E9
| 374517 ||  || — || December 25, 2005 || Kitt Peak || Spacewatch || HEN || align=right | 1.2 km || 
|-id=518 bgcolor=#E9E9E9
| 374518 ||  || — || December 25, 2005 || Mount Lemmon || Mount Lemmon Survey || EUN || align=right | 1.4 km || 
|-id=519 bgcolor=#E9E9E9
| 374519 ||  || — || December 25, 2005 || Mount Lemmon || Mount Lemmon Survey || — || align=right | 2.3 km || 
|-id=520 bgcolor=#E9E9E9
| 374520 ||  || — || December 28, 2005 || Kitt Peak || Spacewatch || — || align=right | 2.0 km || 
|-id=521 bgcolor=#E9E9E9
| 374521 ||  || — || January 4, 2006 || Kitt Peak || Spacewatch || — || align=right | 2.8 km || 
|-id=522 bgcolor=#E9E9E9
| 374522 ||  || — || January 5, 2006 || Mount Lemmon || Mount Lemmon Survey || HOF || align=right | 3.7 km || 
|-id=523 bgcolor=#E9E9E9
| 374523 ||  || — || January 5, 2006 || Mount Lemmon || Mount Lemmon Survey || — || align=right | 2.0 km || 
|-id=524 bgcolor=#E9E9E9
| 374524 ||  || — || January 5, 2006 || Mount Lemmon || Mount Lemmon Survey || GEF || align=right | 1.3 km || 
|-id=525 bgcolor=#E9E9E9
| 374525 ||  || — || January 5, 2006 || Catalina || CSS || — || align=right | 2.7 km || 
|-id=526 bgcolor=#E9E9E9
| 374526 ||  || — || January 5, 2006 || Kitt Peak || Spacewatch || — || align=right | 1.4 km || 
|-id=527 bgcolor=#E9E9E9
| 374527 ||  || — || December 25, 2005 || Kitt Peak || Spacewatch || — || align=right | 1.9 km || 
|-id=528 bgcolor=#E9E9E9
| 374528 ||  || — || January 5, 2006 || Kitt Peak || Spacewatch || WIT || align=right | 1.2 km || 
|-id=529 bgcolor=#E9E9E9
| 374529 ||  || — || January 5, 2006 || Kitt Peak || Spacewatch || WIT || align=right | 1.1 km || 
|-id=530 bgcolor=#E9E9E9
| 374530 ||  || — || January 8, 2006 || Mount Lemmon || Mount Lemmon Survey || — || align=right | 2.2 km || 
|-id=531 bgcolor=#E9E9E9
| 374531 ||  || — || January 8, 2006 || Mount Lemmon || Mount Lemmon Survey || — || align=right | 2.5 km || 
|-id=532 bgcolor=#E9E9E9
| 374532 ||  || — || January 8, 2006 || Catalina || CSS || — || align=right | 1.5 km || 
|-id=533 bgcolor=#E9E9E9
| 374533 ||  || — || January 2, 2006 || Mount Lemmon || Mount Lemmon Survey || — || align=right | 2.0 km || 
|-id=534 bgcolor=#E9E9E9
| 374534 ||  || — || January 6, 2006 || Anderson Mesa || LONEOS || RAF || align=right | 1.2 km || 
|-id=535 bgcolor=#E9E9E9
| 374535 ||  || — || October 24, 2005 || Mauna Kea || A. Boattini || — || align=right | 2.7 km || 
|-id=536 bgcolor=#E9E9E9
| 374536 ||  || — || January 7, 2006 || Mount Lemmon || Mount Lemmon Survey || — || align=right | 2.9 km || 
|-id=537 bgcolor=#E9E9E9
| 374537 ||  || — || January 22, 2006 || Anderson Mesa || LONEOS || — || align=right | 1.6 km || 
|-id=538 bgcolor=#E9E9E9
| 374538 ||  || — || January 24, 2006 || Nyukasa || Mount Nyukasa Stn. || — || align=right | 1.6 km || 
|-id=539 bgcolor=#E9E9E9
| 374539 ||  || — || January 22, 2006 || Mount Lemmon || Mount Lemmon Survey || PAD || align=right | 1.9 km || 
|-id=540 bgcolor=#E9E9E9
| 374540 ||  || — || January 22, 2006 || Anderson Mesa || LONEOS || — || align=right | 1.3 km || 
|-id=541 bgcolor=#E9E9E9
| 374541 ||  || — || January 23, 2006 || Kitt Peak || Spacewatch || — || align=right | 2.6 km || 
|-id=542 bgcolor=#E9E9E9
| 374542 ||  || — || January 23, 2006 || Kitt Peak || Spacewatch || HOF || align=right | 2.6 km || 
|-id=543 bgcolor=#E9E9E9
| 374543 ||  || — || January 23, 2006 || Kitt Peak || Spacewatch || — || align=right | 2.3 km || 
|-id=544 bgcolor=#E9E9E9
| 374544 ||  || — || January 23, 2006 || Kitt Peak || Spacewatch || — || align=right | 2.1 km || 
|-id=545 bgcolor=#E9E9E9
| 374545 ||  || — || January 24, 2006 || Socorro || LINEAR || — || align=right | 2.2 km || 
|-id=546 bgcolor=#E9E9E9
| 374546 ||  || — || January 25, 2006 || Kitt Peak || Spacewatch || — || align=right | 2.4 km || 
|-id=547 bgcolor=#E9E9E9
| 374547 ||  || — || January 26, 2006 || Kitt Peak || Spacewatch || — || align=right | 2.4 km || 
|-id=548 bgcolor=#E9E9E9
| 374548 ||  || — || January 26, 2006 || Kitt Peak || Spacewatch || AGN || align=right | 1.4 km || 
|-id=549 bgcolor=#E9E9E9
| 374549 ||  || — || January 25, 2006 || Kitt Peak || Spacewatch || WIT || align=right | 1.1 km || 
|-id=550 bgcolor=#E9E9E9
| 374550 ||  || — || January 25, 2006 || Kitt Peak || Spacewatch || HOF || align=right | 2.5 km || 
|-id=551 bgcolor=#E9E9E9
| 374551 ||  || — || January 26, 2006 || Mount Lemmon || Mount Lemmon Survey || WIT || align=right | 1.3 km || 
|-id=552 bgcolor=#E9E9E9
| 374552 ||  || — || January 26, 2006 || Kitt Peak || Spacewatch || — || align=right | 2.2 km || 
|-id=553 bgcolor=#E9E9E9
| 374553 ||  || — || January 26, 2006 || Kitt Peak || Spacewatch || — || align=right | 2.3 km || 
|-id=554 bgcolor=#E9E9E9
| 374554 ||  || — || January 26, 2006 || Kitt Peak || Spacewatch || — || align=right | 1.4 km || 
|-id=555 bgcolor=#d6d6d6
| 374555 ||  || — || January 26, 2006 || Kitt Peak || Spacewatch || BRA || align=right | 1.8 km || 
|-id=556 bgcolor=#E9E9E9
| 374556 ||  || — || January 28, 2006 || Kitt Peak || Spacewatch || — || align=right | 1.9 km || 
|-id=557 bgcolor=#E9E9E9
| 374557 ||  || — || January 28, 2006 || Bergisch Gladbac || W. Bickel || MIS || align=right | 2.1 km || 
|-id=558 bgcolor=#E9E9E9
| 374558 ||  || — || January 25, 2006 || Kitt Peak || Spacewatch || WIT || align=right | 1.1 km || 
|-id=559 bgcolor=#E9E9E9
| 374559 ||  || — || January 27, 2006 || Anderson Mesa || LONEOS || — || align=right | 1.4 km || 
|-id=560 bgcolor=#E9E9E9
| 374560 ||  || — || January 28, 2006 || Kitt Peak || Spacewatch || GEF || align=right data-sort-value="0.98" | 980 m || 
|-id=561 bgcolor=#E9E9E9
| 374561 ||  || — || January 30, 2006 || Kitt Peak || Spacewatch || — || align=right | 1.4 km || 
|-id=562 bgcolor=#E9E9E9
| 374562 ||  || — || January 23, 2006 || Catalina || CSS || — || align=right | 1.6 km || 
|-id=563 bgcolor=#E9E9E9
| 374563 ||  || — || January 23, 2006 || Mount Lemmon || Mount Lemmon Survey || HOF || align=right | 2.5 km || 
|-id=564 bgcolor=#C2FFFF
| 374564 ||  || — || January 30, 2006 || Kitt Peak || Spacewatch || L5 || align=right | 9.0 km || 
|-id=565 bgcolor=#E9E9E9
| 374565 ||  || — || January 23, 2006 || Mount Lemmon || Mount Lemmon Survey || AGN || align=right | 1.2 km || 
|-id=566 bgcolor=#E9E9E9
| 374566 ||  || — || January 23, 2006 || Kitt Peak || Spacewatch || — || align=right | 2.5 km || 
|-id=567 bgcolor=#E9E9E9
| 374567 ||  || — || January 31, 2006 || Kitt Peak || Spacewatch || — || align=right | 2.3 km || 
|-id=568 bgcolor=#E9E9E9
| 374568 ||  || — || January 31, 2006 || Kitt Peak || Spacewatch || HEN || align=right | 1.1 km || 
|-id=569 bgcolor=#E9E9E9
| 374569 ||  || — || January 31, 2006 || Kitt Peak || Spacewatch || HOF || align=right | 3.4 km || 
|-id=570 bgcolor=#E9E9E9
| 374570 ||  || — || January 31, 2006 || Kitt Peak || Spacewatch || MIS || align=right | 1.7 km || 
|-id=571 bgcolor=#E9E9E9
| 374571 ||  || — || January 30, 2006 || Kitt Peak || Spacewatch || GEF || align=right | 1.6 km || 
|-id=572 bgcolor=#E9E9E9
| 374572 ||  || — || January 26, 2006 || Kitt Peak || Spacewatch || HOF || align=right | 2.8 km || 
|-id=573 bgcolor=#E9E9E9
| 374573 ||  || — || January 31, 2006 || Kitt Peak || Spacewatch || CLO || align=right | 2.0 km || 
|-id=574 bgcolor=#E9E9E9
| 374574 ||  || — || January 23, 2006 || Kitt Peak || Spacewatch || — || align=right | 1.7 km || 
|-id=575 bgcolor=#fefefe
| 374575 ||  || — || February 6, 2006 || Socorro || LINEAR || H || align=right data-sort-value="0.63" | 630 m || 
|-id=576 bgcolor=#E9E9E9
| 374576 ||  || — || February 2, 2006 || Kitt Peak || Spacewatch || — || align=right | 2.3 km || 
|-id=577 bgcolor=#E9E9E9
| 374577 ||  || — || February 2, 2006 || Mount Lemmon || Mount Lemmon Survey || — || align=right | 1.3 km || 
|-id=578 bgcolor=#E9E9E9
| 374578 ||  || — || February 2, 2006 || Mount Lemmon || Mount Lemmon Survey || DOR || align=right | 2.1 km || 
|-id=579 bgcolor=#E9E9E9
| 374579 ||  || — || February 2, 2006 || Kitt Peak || Spacewatch || — || align=right | 1.5 km || 
|-id=580 bgcolor=#C2FFFF
| 374580 ||  || — || February 4, 2006 || Kitt Peak || Spacewatch || L5 || align=right | 9.1 km || 
|-id=581 bgcolor=#E9E9E9
| 374581 ||  || — || October 28, 2005 || Mount Lemmon || Mount Lemmon Survey || — || align=right | 4.1 km || 
|-id=582 bgcolor=#E9E9E9
| 374582 ||  || — || February 21, 2006 || Catalina || CSS || — || align=right | 3.0 km || 
|-id=583 bgcolor=#E9E9E9
| 374583 ||  || — || January 31, 2006 || Kitt Peak || Spacewatch || HOF || align=right | 2.6 km || 
|-id=584 bgcolor=#E9E9E9
| 374584 ||  || — || February 2, 2006 || Mount Lemmon || Mount Lemmon Survey || — || align=right | 2.3 km || 
|-id=585 bgcolor=#d6d6d6
| 374585 ||  || — || February 20, 2006 || Kitt Peak || Spacewatch || — || align=right | 3.3 km || 
|-id=586 bgcolor=#E9E9E9
| 374586 ||  || — || February 21, 2006 || Mount Lemmon || Mount Lemmon Survey || — || align=right | 1.4 km || 
|-id=587 bgcolor=#E9E9E9
| 374587 ||  || — || February 23, 2006 || Kitt Peak || Spacewatch || — || align=right | 1.6 km || 
|-id=588 bgcolor=#d6d6d6
| 374588 ||  || — || February 24, 2006 || Kitt Peak || Spacewatch || — || align=right | 2.7 km || 
|-id=589 bgcolor=#E9E9E9
| 374589 ||  || — || February 24, 2006 || Mount Lemmon || Mount Lemmon Survey || — || align=right | 2.2 km || 
|-id=590 bgcolor=#d6d6d6
| 374590 ||  || — || February 24, 2006 || Kitt Peak || Spacewatch || KAR || align=right | 1.3 km || 
|-id=591 bgcolor=#E9E9E9
| 374591 ||  || — || February 24, 2006 || Kitt Peak || Spacewatch || IAN || align=right data-sort-value="0.90" | 900 m || 
|-id=592 bgcolor=#d6d6d6
| 374592 ||  || — || February 24, 2006 || Kitt Peak || Spacewatch || — || align=right | 3.0 km || 
|-id=593 bgcolor=#d6d6d6
| 374593 ||  || — || February 24, 2006 || Kitt Peak || Spacewatch || — || align=right | 2.1 km || 
|-id=594 bgcolor=#d6d6d6
| 374594 ||  || — || February 24, 2006 || Kitt Peak || Spacewatch || KOR || align=right | 1.6 km || 
|-id=595 bgcolor=#d6d6d6
| 374595 ||  || — || February 24, 2006 || Kitt Peak || Spacewatch || — || align=right | 3.8 km || 
|-id=596 bgcolor=#d6d6d6
| 374596 ||  || — || February 24, 2006 || Kitt Peak || Spacewatch || — || align=right | 2.9 km || 
|-id=597 bgcolor=#E9E9E9
| 374597 ||  || — || February 24, 2006 || Kitt Peak || Spacewatch || — || align=right | 2.7 km || 
|-id=598 bgcolor=#d6d6d6
| 374598 ||  || — || February 25, 2006 || Mount Lemmon || Mount Lemmon Survey || — || align=right | 3.5 km || 
|-id=599 bgcolor=#d6d6d6
| 374599 ||  || — || February 25, 2006 || Mount Lemmon || Mount Lemmon Survey || KAR || align=right | 1.1 km || 
|-id=600 bgcolor=#E9E9E9
| 374600 ||  || — || February 25, 2006 || Kitt Peak || Spacewatch || DOR || align=right | 2.8 km || 
|}

374601–374700 

|-bgcolor=#d6d6d6
| 374601 ||  || — || February 27, 2006 || Kitt Peak || Spacewatch || KOR || align=right | 1.3 km || 
|-id=602 bgcolor=#d6d6d6
| 374602 ||  || — || February 24, 2006 || Catalina || CSS || — || align=right | 3.5 km || 
|-id=603 bgcolor=#E9E9E9
| 374603 ||  || — || February 1, 2006 || Mount Lemmon || Mount Lemmon Survey || HOF || align=right | 4.5 km || 
|-id=604 bgcolor=#d6d6d6
| 374604 ||  || — || February 25, 2006 || Kitt Peak || Spacewatch || CHA || align=right | 3.0 km || 
|-id=605 bgcolor=#C2FFFF
| 374605 ||  || — || February 1, 2006 || Kitt Peak || Spacewatch || L5 || align=right | 9.2 km || 
|-id=606 bgcolor=#E9E9E9
| 374606 ||  || — || February 25, 2006 || Kitt Peak || Spacewatch || GEF || align=right | 1.4 km || 
|-id=607 bgcolor=#E9E9E9
| 374607 ||  || — || February 25, 2006 || Mount Lemmon || Mount Lemmon Survey || — || align=right | 3.1 km || 
|-id=608 bgcolor=#d6d6d6
| 374608 ||  || — || February 25, 2006 || Kitt Peak || Spacewatch || — || align=right | 2.6 km || 
|-id=609 bgcolor=#d6d6d6
| 374609 ||  || — || February 25, 2006 || Kitt Peak || Spacewatch || CHA || align=right | 2.2 km || 
|-id=610 bgcolor=#E9E9E9
| 374610 ||  || — || February 27, 2006 || Mount Lemmon || Mount Lemmon Survey || AGN || align=right | 1.4 km || 
|-id=611 bgcolor=#d6d6d6
| 374611 ||  || — || February 27, 2006 || Kitt Peak || Spacewatch || — || align=right | 2.7 km || 
|-id=612 bgcolor=#E9E9E9
| 374612 ||  || — || February 24, 2006 || Kitt Peak || Spacewatch || AGN || align=right | 1.3 km || 
|-id=613 bgcolor=#C2FFFF
| 374613 ||  || — || February 21, 2006 || Mount Lemmon || Mount Lemmon Survey || L5 || align=right | 12 km || 
|-id=614 bgcolor=#E9E9E9
| 374614 ||  || — || March 3, 2006 || Kitt Peak || Spacewatch || AST || align=right | 1.7 km || 
|-id=615 bgcolor=#d6d6d6
| 374615 ||  || — || March 3, 2006 || Kitt Peak || Spacewatch || KOR || align=right | 1.5 km || 
|-id=616 bgcolor=#E9E9E9
| 374616 ||  || — || March 3, 2006 || Kitt Peak || Spacewatch || — || align=right | 3.2 km || 
|-id=617 bgcolor=#d6d6d6
| 374617 ||  || — || March 3, 2006 || Kitt Peak || Spacewatch || KOR || align=right | 1.5 km || 
|-id=618 bgcolor=#fefefe
| 374618 ||  || — || March 4, 2006 || Kitt Peak || Spacewatch || — || align=right | 1.1 km || 
|-id=619 bgcolor=#E9E9E9
| 374619 ||  || — || March 9, 2006 || Catalina || CSS || BAR || align=right | 1.4 km || 
|-id=620 bgcolor=#E9E9E9
| 374620 ||  || — || March 5, 2006 || Kitt Peak || Spacewatch || — || align=right | 3.1 km || 
|-id=621 bgcolor=#d6d6d6
| 374621 ||  || — || March 23, 2006 || Kitt Peak || Spacewatch || EOS || align=right | 2.0 km || 
|-id=622 bgcolor=#E9E9E9
| 374622 ||  || — || March 23, 2006 || Catalina || CSS || — || align=right | 3.1 km || 
|-id=623 bgcolor=#d6d6d6
| 374623 ||  || — || March 21, 2006 || Mount Lemmon || Mount Lemmon Survey || — || align=right | 2.2 km || 
|-id=624 bgcolor=#d6d6d6
| 374624 ||  || — || February 27, 2006 || Kitt Peak || Spacewatch || — || align=right | 3.2 km || 
|-id=625 bgcolor=#d6d6d6
| 374625 ||  || — || March 24, 2006 || Mount Lemmon || Mount Lemmon Survey || URS || align=right | 3.8 km || 
|-id=626 bgcolor=#d6d6d6
| 374626 ||  || — || April 2, 2006 || Kitt Peak || Spacewatch || — || align=right | 3.0 km || 
|-id=627 bgcolor=#d6d6d6
| 374627 ||  || — || April 7, 2006 || Mount Lemmon || Mount Lemmon Survey || KOR || align=right | 1.5 km || 
|-id=628 bgcolor=#d6d6d6
| 374628 ||  || — || April 18, 2006 || Kitt Peak || Spacewatch || 637 || align=right | 3.1 km || 
|-id=629 bgcolor=#d6d6d6
| 374629 ||  || — || April 20, 2006 || Kitt Peak || Spacewatch || EUP || align=right | 4.4 km || 
|-id=630 bgcolor=#d6d6d6
| 374630 ||  || — || April 20, 2006 || Kitt Peak || Spacewatch || — || align=right | 3.4 km || 
|-id=631 bgcolor=#d6d6d6
| 374631 ||  || — || April 19, 2006 || Mount Lemmon || Mount Lemmon Survey || THM || align=right | 2.8 km || 
|-id=632 bgcolor=#d6d6d6
| 374632 ||  || — || April 21, 2006 || Kitt Peak || Spacewatch || CRO || align=right | 3.2 km || 
|-id=633 bgcolor=#d6d6d6
| 374633 ||  || — || April 25, 2006 || Kitt Peak || Spacewatch || — || align=right | 2.8 km || 
|-id=634 bgcolor=#d6d6d6
| 374634 ||  || — || March 23, 2006 || Mount Lemmon || Mount Lemmon Survey || — || align=right | 2.7 km || 
|-id=635 bgcolor=#d6d6d6
| 374635 ||  || — || April 24, 2006 || Kitt Peak || Spacewatch || HYG || align=right | 2.9 km || 
|-id=636 bgcolor=#fefefe
| 374636 ||  || — || April 8, 2006 || Kitt Peak || Spacewatch || — || align=right data-sort-value="0.57" | 570 m || 
|-id=637 bgcolor=#d6d6d6
| 374637 ||  || — || April 24, 2006 || Kitt Peak || Spacewatch || — || align=right | 2.7 km || 
|-id=638 bgcolor=#d6d6d6
| 374638 ||  || — || February 27, 2006 || Mount Lemmon || Mount Lemmon Survey || — || align=right | 3.0 km || 
|-id=639 bgcolor=#d6d6d6
| 374639 ||  || — || April 25, 2006 || Kitt Peak || Spacewatch || HYG || align=right | 3.2 km || 
|-id=640 bgcolor=#d6d6d6
| 374640 ||  || — || April 26, 2006 || Kitt Peak || Spacewatch || EOS || align=right | 2.5 km || 
|-id=641 bgcolor=#d6d6d6
| 374641 ||  || — || April 27, 2006 || Kitt Peak || Spacewatch || — || align=right | 4.2 km || 
|-id=642 bgcolor=#d6d6d6
| 374642 ||  || — || April 29, 2006 || Kitt Peak || Spacewatch || — || align=right | 3.7 km || 
|-id=643 bgcolor=#d6d6d6
| 374643 ||  || — || April 30, 2006 || Kitt Peak || Spacewatch || — || align=right | 5.0 km || 
|-id=644 bgcolor=#d6d6d6
| 374644 ||  || — || April 30, 2006 || Kitt Peak || Spacewatch || — || align=right | 3.3 km || 
|-id=645 bgcolor=#d6d6d6
| 374645 ||  || — || April 26, 2006 || Cerro Tololo || M. W. Buie || — || align=right | 2.1 km || 
|-id=646 bgcolor=#d6d6d6
| 374646 ||  || — || April 21, 2006 || Kitt Peak || Spacewatch || — || align=right | 3.4 km || 
|-id=647 bgcolor=#d6d6d6
| 374647 ||  || — || May 1, 2006 || Kitt Peak || Spacewatch || EOS || align=right | 2.8 km || 
|-id=648 bgcolor=#d6d6d6
| 374648 ||  || — || April 24, 2006 || Kitt Peak || Spacewatch || — || align=right | 3.1 km || 
|-id=649 bgcolor=#d6d6d6
| 374649 ||  || — || May 5, 2006 || Reedy Creek || J. Broughton || HYG || align=right | 3.9 km || 
|-id=650 bgcolor=#d6d6d6
| 374650 ||  || — || May 3, 2006 || Kitt Peak || Spacewatch || THM || align=right | 2.5 km || 
|-id=651 bgcolor=#d6d6d6
| 374651 ||  || — || May 4, 2006 || Kitt Peak || Spacewatch || — || align=right | 2.6 km || 
|-id=652 bgcolor=#d6d6d6
| 374652 ||  || — || May 14, 2006 || Palomar || NEAT || — || align=right | 5.4 km || 
|-id=653 bgcolor=#E9E9E9
| 374653 ||  || — || May 1, 2006 || Kitt Peak || M. W. Buie || — || align=right | 2.2 km || 
|-id=654 bgcolor=#d6d6d6
| 374654 ||  || — || April 21, 2006 || Mount Lemmon || Mount Lemmon Survey || — || align=right | 2.3 km || 
|-id=655 bgcolor=#fefefe
| 374655 ||  || — || May 7, 2006 || Mount Lemmon || Mount Lemmon Survey || — || align=right data-sort-value="0.66" | 660 m || 
|-id=656 bgcolor=#d6d6d6
| 374656 ||  || — || May 19, 2006 || Mount Lemmon || Mount Lemmon Survey || EOS || align=right | 2.6 km || 
|-id=657 bgcolor=#d6d6d6
| 374657 ||  || — || May 21, 2006 || Kitt Peak || Spacewatch || EOS || align=right | 2.1 km || 
|-id=658 bgcolor=#d6d6d6
| 374658 ||  || — || May 21, 2006 || Kitt Peak || Spacewatch || 7:4* || align=right | 2.7 km || 
|-id=659 bgcolor=#d6d6d6
| 374659 ||  || — || May 19, 2006 || Mount Lemmon || Mount Lemmon Survey || — || align=right | 2.6 km || 
|-id=660 bgcolor=#d6d6d6
| 374660 ||  || — || May 21, 2006 || Kitt Peak || Spacewatch || — || align=right | 3.5 km || 
|-id=661 bgcolor=#d6d6d6
| 374661 ||  || — || May 22, 2006 || Kitt Peak || Spacewatch || TIR || align=right | 3.0 km || 
|-id=662 bgcolor=#fefefe
| 374662 ||  || — || May 21, 2006 || Kitt Peak || Spacewatch || FLO || align=right data-sort-value="0.46" | 460 m || 
|-id=663 bgcolor=#d6d6d6
| 374663 ||  || — || May 21, 2006 || Kitt Peak || Spacewatch || — || align=right | 4.1 km || 
|-id=664 bgcolor=#d6d6d6
| 374664 ||  || — || May 22, 2006 || Kitt Peak || Spacewatch || — || align=right | 3.5 km || 
|-id=665 bgcolor=#d6d6d6
| 374665 ||  || — || May 22, 2006 || Kitt Peak || Spacewatch || VER || align=right | 3.1 km || 
|-id=666 bgcolor=#d6d6d6
| 374666 ||  || — || May 24, 2006 || Mount Lemmon || Mount Lemmon Survey || — || align=right | 2.7 km || 
|-id=667 bgcolor=#d6d6d6
| 374667 ||  || — || May 22, 2006 || Kitt Peak || Spacewatch || — || align=right | 4.7 km || 
|-id=668 bgcolor=#d6d6d6
| 374668 ||  || — || May 26, 2006 || Kitt Peak || Spacewatch || — || align=right | 3.6 km || 
|-id=669 bgcolor=#d6d6d6
| 374669 ||  || — || May 31, 2006 || Mount Lemmon || Mount Lemmon Survey || EOS || align=right | 2.3 km || 
|-id=670 bgcolor=#d6d6d6
| 374670 ||  || — || May 31, 2006 || Mount Lemmon || Mount Lemmon Survey || — || align=right | 3.8 km || 
|-id=671 bgcolor=#d6d6d6
| 374671 ||  || — || February 25, 2006 || Mount Lemmon || Mount Lemmon Survey || THB || align=right | 4.6 km || 
|-id=672 bgcolor=#d6d6d6
| 374672 ||  || — || May 28, 2006 || Kitt Peak || Spacewatch || — || align=right | 4.0 km || 
|-id=673 bgcolor=#d6d6d6
| 374673 ||  || — || May 9, 2006 || Mount Lemmon || Mount Lemmon Survey || EOS || align=right | 2.3 km || 
|-id=674 bgcolor=#fefefe
| 374674 ||  || — || August 15, 2006 || Palomar || NEAT || — || align=right data-sort-value="0.81" | 810 m || 
|-id=675 bgcolor=#fefefe
| 374675 ||  || — || August 15, 2006 || Palomar || NEAT || — || align=right data-sort-value="0.75" | 750 m || 
|-id=676 bgcolor=#fefefe
| 374676 || 2006 QD || — || August 17, 2006 || Hibiscus || S. F. Hönig || — || align=right data-sort-value="0.74" | 740 m || 
|-id=677 bgcolor=#fefefe
| 374677 ||  || — || August 17, 2006 || Palomar || NEAT || — || align=right data-sort-value="0.78" | 780 m || 
|-id=678 bgcolor=#fefefe
| 374678 ||  || — || August 19, 2006 || Kitt Peak || Spacewatch || — || align=right data-sort-value="0.78" | 780 m || 
|-id=679 bgcolor=#fefefe
| 374679 ||  || — || August 18, 2006 || Kitt Peak || Spacewatch || FLO || align=right data-sort-value="0.72" | 720 m || 
|-id=680 bgcolor=#fefefe
| 374680 ||  || — || August 19, 2006 || Anderson Mesa || LONEOS || FLO || align=right data-sort-value="0.70" | 700 m || 
|-id=681 bgcolor=#fefefe
| 374681 ||  || — || August 22, 2006 || Palomar || NEAT || — || align=right data-sort-value="0.66" | 660 m || 
|-id=682 bgcolor=#fefefe
| 374682 ||  || — || August 22, 2006 || Palomar || NEAT || — || align=right data-sort-value="0.83" | 830 m || 
|-id=683 bgcolor=#fefefe
| 374683 ||  || — || August 27, 2006 || Schiaparelli || Schiaparelli Obs. || — || align=right data-sort-value="0.84" | 840 m || 
|-id=684 bgcolor=#FA8072
| 374684 ||  || — || August 25, 2006 || Socorro || LINEAR || — || align=right data-sort-value="0.85" | 850 m || 
|-id=685 bgcolor=#fefefe
| 374685 ||  || — || February 4, 2005 || Mount Lemmon || Mount Lemmon Survey || — || align=right data-sort-value="0.76" | 760 m || 
|-id=686 bgcolor=#fefefe
| 374686 ||  || — || August 22, 2006 || Palomar || NEAT || FLO || align=right data-sort-value="0.62" | 620 m || 
|-id=687 bgcolor=#fefefe
| 374687 ||  || — || August 27, 2006 || Anderson Mesa || LONEOS || — || align=right data-sort-value="0.65" | 650 m || 
|-id=688 bgcolor=#fefefe
| 374688 ||  || — || August 29, 2006 || Catalina || CSS || FLO || align=right data-sort-value="0.77" | 770 m || 
|-id=689 bgcolor=#fefefe
| 374689 ||  || — || August 29, 2006 || Catalina || CSS || — || align=right data-sort-value="0.76" | 760 m || 
|-id=690 bgcolor=#fefefe
| 374690 ||  || — || August 16, 2006 || Palomar || NEAT || FLO || align=right data-sort-value="0.63" | 630 m || 
|-id=691 bgcolor=#fefefe
| 374691 ||  || — || August 18, 2006 || Kitt Peak || Spacewatch || — || align=right data-sort-value="0.94" | 940 m || 
|-id=692 bgcolor=#fefefe
| 374692 ||  || — || August 28, 2006 || Kitt Peak || Spacewatch || — || align=right data-sort-value="0.83" | 830 m || 
|-id=693 bgcolor=#fefefe
| 374693 ||  || — || September 12, 2006 || Catalina || CSS || — || align=right | 1.1 km || 
|-id=694 bgcolor=#fefefe
| 374694 ||  || — || October 21, 2003 || Kitt Peak || Spacewatch || — || align=right | 1.1 km || 
|-id=695 bgcolor=#fefefe
| 374695 ||  || — || September 14, 2006 || Palomar || NEAT || FLO || align=right data-sort-value="0.67" | 670 m || 
|-id=696 bgcolor=#fefefe
| 374696 ||  || — || September 15, 2006 || Kitt Peak || Spacewatch || — || align=right data-sort-value="0.75" | 750 m || 
|-id=697 bgcolor=#fefefe
| 374697 ||  || — || September 12, 2006 || Catalina || CSS || NYS || align=right data-sort-value="0.71" | 710 m || 
|-id=698 bgcolor=#fefefe
| 374698 ||  || — || September 14, 2006 || Kitt Peak || Spacewatch || — || align=right data-sort-value="0.86" | 860 m || 
|-id=699 bgcolor=#fefefe
| 374699 ||  || — || September 14, 2006 || Kitt Peak || Spacewatch || — || align=right data-sort-value="0.83" | 830 m || 
|-id=700 bgcolor=#fefefe
| 374700 ||  || — || July 21, 2006 || Mount Lemmon || Mount Lemmon Survey || — || align=right data-sort-value="0.68" | 680 m || 
|}

374701–374800 

|-bgcolor=#fefefe
| 374701 ||  || — || September 15, 2006 || Kitt Peak || Spacewatch || — || align=right data-sort-value="0.97" | 970 m || 
|-id=702 bgcolor=#fefefe
| 374702 ||  || — || September 12, 2006 || Catalina || CSS || slow || align=right data-sort-value="0.69" | 690 m || 
|-id=703 bgcolor=#fefefe
| 374703 ||  || — || September 14, 2006 || Palomar || NEAT || — || align=right | 1.0 km || 
|-id=704 bgcolor=#fefefe
| 374704 ||  || — || September 15, 2006 || Kitt Peak || Spacewatch || NYS || align=right data-sort-value="0.67" | 670 m || 
|-id=705 bgcolor=#fefefe
| 374705 ||  || — || September 15, 2006 || Kitt Peak || Spacewatch || — || align=right data-sort-value="0.86" | 860 m || 
|-id=706 bgcolor=#fefefe
| 374706 ||  || — || September 14, 2006 || Kitt Peak || Spacewatch || — || align=right data-sort-value="0.76" | 760 m || 
|-id=707 bgcolor=#fefefe
| 374707 ||  || — || September 15, 2006 || Kitt Peak || Spacewatch || — || align=right data-sort-value="0.67" | 670 m || 
|-id=708 bgcolor=#fefefe
| 374708 ||  || — || September 14, 2006 || Catalina || CSS || V || align=right data-sort-value="0.84" | 840 m || 
|-id=709 bgcolor=#fefefe
| 374709 ||  || — || September 14, 2006 || Kitt Peak || Spacewatch || V || align=right data-sort-value="0.59" | 590 m || 
|-id=710 bgcolor=#fefefe
| 374710 ʻOʻo ||  ||  || September 14, 2006 || Mauna Kea || J. Masiero || MAS || align=right data-sort-value="0.63" | 630 m || 
|-id=711 bgcolor=#fefefe
| 374711 ||  || — || September 16, 2006 || Socorro || LINEAR || — || align=right data-sort-value="0.81" | 810 m || 
|-id=712 bgcolor=#fefefe
| 374712 ||  || — || September 17, 2006 || Kitt Peak || Spacewatch || NYS || align=right data-sort-value="0.67" | 670 m || 
|-id=713 bgcolor=#fefefe
| 374713 ||  || — || July 21, 2006 || Mount Lemmon || Mount Lemmon Survey || V || align=right data-sort-value="0.59" | 590 m || 
|-id=714 bgcolor=#fefefe
| 374714 ||  || — || September 17, 2006 || Kitt Peak || Spacewatch || FLO || align=right data-sort-value="0.65" | 650 m || 
|-id=715 bgcolor=#fefefe
| 374715 Dimpourbaix ||  ||  || September 19, 2006 || Uccle || T. Pauwels || — || align=right data-sort-value="0.86" | 860 m || 
|-id=716 bgcolor=#fefefe
| 374716 ||  || — || September 17, 2006 || Anderson Mesa || LONEOS || — || align=right | 1.0 km || 
|-id=717 bgcolor=#fefefe
| 374717 ||  || — || September 16, 2006 || Catalina || CSS || V || align=right data-sort-value="0.64" | 640 m || 
|-id=718 bgcolor=#fefefe
| 374718 ||  || — || August 28, 2006 || Catalina || CSS || FLO || align=right data-sort-value="0.72" | 720 m || 
|-id=719 bgcolor=#fefefe
| 374719 ||  || — || September 16, 2006 || Catalina || CSS || — || align=right data-sort-value="0.85" | 850 m || 
|-id=720 bgcolor=#fefefe
| 374720 ||  || — || September 16, 2006 || Catalina || CSS || V || align=right data-sort-value="0.63" | 630 m || 
|-id=721 bgcolor=#fefefe
| 374721 ||  || — || September 16, 2006 || Palomar || NEAT || FLO || align=right data-sort-value="0.64" | 640 m || 
|-id=722 bgcolor=#fefefe
| 374722 ||  || — || September 17, 2006 || Anderson Mesa || LONEOS || FLO || align=right data-sort-value="0.70" | 700 m || 
|-id=723 bgcolor=#fefefe
| 374723 ||  || — || September 16, 2006 || Kitt Peak || Spacewatch || FLO || align=right data-sort-value="0.55" | 550 m || 
|-id=724 bgcolor=#fefefe
| 374724 ||  || — || September 20, 2006 || La Sagra || OAM Obs. || — || align=right data-sort-value="0.65" | 650 m || 
|-id=725 bgcolor=#fefefe
| 374725 ||  || — || September 19, 2006 || Anderson Mesa || LONEOS || V || align=right data-sort-value="0.69" | 690 m || 
|-id=726 bgcolor=#fefefe
| 374726 ||  || — || September 17, 2006 || Kitt Peak || Spacewatch || V || align=right data-sort-value="0.59" | 590 m || 
|-id=727 bgcolor=#fefefe
| 374727 ||  || — || September 18, 2006 || Anderson Mesa || LONEOS || — || align=right data-sort-value="0.60" | 600 m || 
|-id=728 bgcolor=#fefefe
| 374728 ||  || — || July 22, 2006 || Mount Lemmon || Mount Lemmon Survey || NYS || align=right data-sort-value="0.51" | 510 m || 
|-id=729 bgcolor=#fefefe
| 374729 ||  || — || September 19, 2006 || Kitt Peak || Spacewatch || NYS || align=right data-sort-value="0.60" | 600 m || 
|-id=730 bgcolor=#fefefe
| 374730 ||  || — || September 19, 2006 || Kitt Peak || Spacewatch || V || align=right data-sort-value="0.61" | 610 m || 
|-id=731 bgcolor=#fefefe
| 374731 ||  || — || September 17, 2006 || Catalina || CSS || — || align=right data-sort-value="0.78" | 780 m || 
|-id=732 bgcolor=#fefefe
| 374732 ||  || — || September 18, 2006 || Kitt Peak || Spacewatch || FLO || align=right data-sort-value="0.57" | 570 m || 
|-id=733 bgcolor=#fefefe
| 374733 ||  || — || September 18, 2006 || Kitt Peak || Spacewatch || EUT || align=right data-sort-value="0.59" | 590 m || 
|-id=734 bgcolor=#fefefe
| 374734 ||  || — || September 18, 2006 || Kitt Peak || Spacewatch || — || align=right data-sort-value="0.45" | 450 m || 
|-id=735 bgcolor=#fefefe
| 374735 ||  || — || September 18, 2006 || Kitt Peak || Spacewatch || V || align=right data-sort-value="0.78" | 780 m || 
|-id=736 bgcolor=#fefefe
| 374736 ||  || — || September 19, 2006 || Kitt Peak || Spacewatch || FLO || align=right data-sort-value="0.82" | 820 m || 
|-id=737 bgcolor=#fefefe
| 374737 ||  || — || September 19, 2006 || Kitt Peak || Spacewatch || — || align=right data-sort-value="0.67" | 670 m || 
|-id=738 bgcolor=#fefefe
| 374738 ||  || — || August 29, 2006 || Catalina || CSS || V || align=right data-sort-value="0.59" | 590 m || 
|-id=739 bgcolor=#fefefe
| 374739 ||  || — || September 24, 2006 || Kitt Peak || Spacewatch || — || align=right data-sort-value="0.62" | 620 m || 
|-id=740 bgcolor=#fefefe
| 374740 ||  || — || September 18, 2006 || Anderson Mesa || LONEOS || — || align=right data-sort-value="0.76" | 760 m || 
|-id=741 bgcolor=#fefefe
| 374741 ||  || — || September 20, 2006 || Anderson Mesa || LONEOS || FLO || align=right data-sort-value="0.55" | 550 m || 
|-id=742 bgcolor=#E9E9E9
| 374742 ||  || — || September 19, 2006 || Kitt Peak || Spacewatch || — || align=right data-sort-value="0.92" | 920 m || 
|-id=743 bgcolor=#fefefe
| 374743 ||  || — || September 19, 2006 || Kitt Peak || Spacewatch || — || align=right data-sort-value="0.71" | 710 m || 
|-id=744 bgcolor=#fefefe
| 374744 ||  || — || September 23, 2006 || Kitt Peak || Spacewatch || — || align=right data-sort-value="0.62" | 620 m || 
|-id=745 bgcolor=#fefefe
| 374745 ||  || — || September 25, 2006 || Kitt Peak || Spacewatch || — || align=right data-sort-value="0.64" | 640 m || 
|-id=746 bgcolor=#fefefe
| 374746 ||  || — || September 25, 2006 || Kitt Peak || Spacewatch || FLO || align=right data-sort-value="0.71" | 710 m || 
|-id=747 bgcolor=#fefefe
| 374747 ||  || — || September 25, 2006 || Kitt Peak || Spacewatch || FLO || align=right data-sort-value="0.60" | 600 m || 
|-id=748 bgcolor=#fefefe
| 374748 ||  || — || September 25, 2006 || Mount Lemmon || Mount Lemmon Survey || — || align=right data-sort-value="0.57" | 570 m || 
|-id=749 bgcolor=#fefefe
| 374749 ||  || — || September 26, 2006 || Kitt Peak || Spacewatch || — || align=right data-sort-value="0.64" | 640 m || 
|-id=750 bgcolor=#fefefe
| 374750 ||  || — || September 26, 2006 || Kitt Peak || Spacewatch || — || align=right data-sort-value="0.99" | 990 m || 
|-id=751 bgcolor=#fefefe
| 374751 ||  || — || September 25, 2006 || Kitt Peak || Spacewatch || FLO || align=right data-sort-value="0.74" | 740 m || 
|-id=752 bgcolor=#fefefe
| 374752 ||  || — || September 26, 2006 || Kitt Peak || Spacewatch || — || align=right data-sort-value="0.93" | 930 m || 
|-id=753 bgcolor=#fefefe
| 374753 ||  || — || September 26, 2006 || Kitt Peak || Spacewatch || FLO || align=right data-sort-value="0.66" | 660 m || 
|-id=754 bgcolor=#fefefe
| 374754 ||  || — || September 26, 2006 || Kitt Peak || Spacewatch || — || align=right data-sort-value="0.94" | 940 m || 
|-id=755 bgcolor=#fefefe
| 374755 ||  || — || September 26, 2006 || Kitt Peak || Spacewatch || V || align=right data-sort-value="0.55" | 550 m || 
|-id=756 bgcolor=#fefefe
| 374756 ||  || — || September 26, 2006 || Mount Lemmon || Mount Lemmon Survey || — || align=right data-sort-value="0.74" | 740 m || 
|-id=757 bgcolor=#fefefe
| 374757 ||  || — || August 19, 2006 || Kitt Peak || Spacewatch || — || align=right data-sort-value="0.62" | 620 m || 
|-id=758 bgcolor=#fefefe
| 374758 ||  || — || September 26, 2006 || Kitt Peak || Spacewatch || NYS || align=right data-sort-value="0.52" | 520 m || 
|-id=759 bgcolor=#fefefe
| 374759 ||  || — || September 26, 2006 || Kitt Peak || Spacewatch || V || align=right data-sort-value="0.65" | 650 m || 
|-id=760 bgcolor=#fefefe
| 374760 ||  || — || September 26, 2006 || Kitt Peak || Spacewatch || — || align=right data-sort-value="0.85" | 850 m || 
|-id=761 bgcolor=#fefefe
| 374761 ||  || — || September 18, 2006 || Catalina || CSS || FLO || align=right data-sort-value="0.77" | 770 m || 
|-id=762 bgcolor=#fefefe
| 374762 ||  || — || September 27, 2006 || Mount Lemmon || Mount Lemmon Survey || NYS || align=right data-sort-value="0.67" | 670 m || 
|-id=763 bgcolor=#fefefe
| 374763 ||  || — || September 28, 2006 || Kitt Peak || Spacewatch || — || align=right data-sort-value="0.77" | 770 m || 
|-id=764 bgcolor=#fefefe
| 374764 ||  || — || September 25, 2006 || Anderson Mesa || LONEOS || NYS || align=right data-sort-value="0.78" | 780 m || 
|-id=765 bgcolor=#fefefe
| 374765 ||  || — || August 27, 2006 || Kitt Peak || Spacewatch || — || align=right data-sort-value="0.76" | 760 m || 
|-id=766 bgcolor=#fefefe
| 374766 ||  || — || August 29, 2006 || Kitt Peak || Spacewatch || — || align=right data-sort-value="0.90" | 900 m || 
|-id=767 bgcolor=#fefefe
| 374767 ||  || — || July 21, 2006 || Mount Lemmon || Mount Lemmon Survey || — || align=right data-sort-value="0.81" | 810 m || 
|-id=768 bgcolor=#fefefe
| 374768 ||  || — || September 25, 2006 || Kitt Peak || Spacewatch || FLO || align=right data-sort-value="0.75" | 750 m || 
|-id=769 bgcolor=#E9E9E9
| 374769 ||  || — || September 27, 2006 || Kitt Peak || Spacewatch || — || align=right data-sort-value="0.78" | 780 m || 
|-id=770 bgcolor=#fefefe
| 374770 ||  || — || September 28, 2006 || Kitt Peak || Spacewatch || — || align=right data-sort-value="0.60" | 600 m || 
|-id=771 bgcolor=#fefefe
| 374771 ||  || — || September 28, 2006 || Kitt Peak || Spacewatch || — || align=right data-sort-value="0.91" | 910 m || 
|-id=772 bgcolor=#fefefe
| 374772 ||  || — || September 18, 2006 || Kitt Peak || Spacewatch || — || align=right data-sort-value="0.91" | 910 m || 
|-id=773 bgcolor=#fefefe
| 374773 ||  || — || September 19, 2006 || Catalina || CSS || V || align=right data-sort-value="0.72" | 720 m || 
|-id=774 bgcolor=#fefefe
| 374774 ||  || — || September 30, 2006 || Catalina || CSS || — || align=right data-sort-value="0.81" | 810 m || 
|-id=775 bgcolor=#fefefe
| 374775 ||  || — || September 30, 2006 || Catalina || CSS || V || align=right data-sort-value="0.73" | 730 m || 
|-id=776 bgcolor=#fefefe
| 374776 ||  || — || September 26, 2006 || Mount Lemmon || Mount Lemmon Survey || — || align=right data-sort-value="0.73" | 730 m || 
|-id=777 bgcolor=#FA8072
| 374777 ||  || — || October 1, 2006 || Kitt Peak || Spacewatch || — || align=right data-sort-value="0.71" | 710 m || 
|-id=778 bgcolor=#fefefe
| 374778 ||  || — || October 1, 2006 || Kitt Peak || Spacewatch || MAS || align=right data-sort-value="0.81" | 810 m || 
|-id=779 bgcolor=#fefefe
| 374779 ||  || — || October 3, 2006 || Mount Lemmon || Mount Lemmon Survey || FLO || align=right data-sort-value="0.79" | 790 m || 
|-id=780 bgcolor=#fefefe
| 374780 ||  || — || October 15, 2006 || Farra d'Isonzo || Farra d'Isonzo || PHO || align=right | 1.3 km || 
|-id=781 bgcolor=#fefefe
| 374781 ||  || — || October 10, 2006 || Palomar || NEAT || — || align=right data-sort-value="0.76" | 760 m || 
|-id=782 bgcolor=#fefefe
| 374782 ||  || — || September 15, 2006 || Kitt Peak || Spacewatch || NYS || align=right data-sort-value="0.57" | 570 m || 
|-id=783 bgcolor=#fefefe
| 374783 ||  || — || October 12, 2006 || Kitt Peak || Spacewatch || FLO || align=right data-sort-value="0.68" | 680 m || 
|-id=784 bgcolor=#fefefe
| 374784 ||  || — || October 12, 2006 || Kitt Peak || Spacewatch || FLO || align=right data-sort-value="0.62" | 620 m || 
|-id=785 bgcolor=#fefefe
| 374785 ||  || — || October 12, 2006 || Kitt Peak || Spacewatch || V || align=right data-sort-value="0.68" | 680 m || 
|-id=786 bgcolor=#fefefe
| 374786 ||  || — || September 27, 2006 || Mount Lemmon || Mount Lemmon Survey || — || align=right data-sort-value="0.69" | 690 m || 
|-id=787 bgcolor=#fefefe
| 374787 ||  || — || October 12, 2006 || Kitt Peak || Spacewatch || FLO || align=right data-sort-value="0.78" | 780 m || 
|-id=788 bgcolor=#fefefe
| 374788 ||  || — || October 12, 2006 || Kitt Peak || Spacewatch || — || align=right data-sort-value="0.73" | 730 m || 
|-id=789 bgcolor=#fefefe
| 374789 ||  || — || September 28, 2006 || Mount Lemmon || Mount Lemmon Survey || — || align=right data-sort-value="0.69" | 690 m || 
|-id=790 bgcolor=#fefefe
| 374790 ||  || — || October 15, 2006 || Catalina || CSS || FLO || align=right data-sort-value="0.63" | 630 m || 
|-id=791 bgcolor=#fefefe
| 374791 ||  || — || September 17, 2006 || Kitt Peak || Spacewatch || NYS || align=right data-sort-value="0.51" | 510 m || 
|-id=792 bgcolor=#fefefe
| 374792 ||  || — || September 18, 2006 || Catalina || CSS || — || align=right data-sort-value="0.88" | 880 m || 
|-id=793 bgcolor=#fefefe
| 374793 ||  || — || October 2, 2006 || Mount Lemmon || Mount Lemmon Survey || NYS || align=right data-sort-value="0.48" | 480 m || 
|-id=794 bgcolor=#fefefe
| 374794 ||  || — || October 11, 2006 || Palomar || NEAT || — || align=right data-sort-value="0.69" | 690 m || 
|-id=795 bgcolor=#fefefe
| 374795 ||  || — || October 12, 2006 || Kitt Peak || Spacewatch || — || align=right data-sort-value="0.91" | 910 m || 
|-id=796 bgcolor=#fefefe
| 374796 ||  || — || October 12, 2006 || Kitt Peak || Spacewatch || — || align=right | 1.0 km || 
|-id=797 bgcolor=#fefefe
| 374797 ||  || — || October 15, 2006 || Kitt Peak || Spacewatch || MAS || align=right data-sort-value="0.51" | 510 m || 
|-id=798 bgcolor=#fefefe
| 374798 ||  || — || October 15, 2006 || Kitt Peak || Spacewatch || — || align=right data-sort-value="0.94" | 940 m || 
|-id=799 bgcolor=#fefefe
| 374799 ||  || — || October 11, 2006 || Palomar || NEAT || V || align=right data-sort-value="0.69" | 690 m || 
|-id=800 bgcolor=#fefefe
| 374800 ||  || — || October 2, 2006 || Mount Lemmon || Mount Lemmon Survey || — || align=right data-sort-value="0.74" | 740 m || 
|}

374801–374900 

|-bgcolor=#fefefe
| 374801 ||  || — || October 3, 2006 || Mount Lemmon || Mount Lemmon Survey || — || align=right data-sort-value="0.97" | 970 m || 
|-id=802 bgcolor=#fefefe
| 374802 ||  || — || October 17, 2006 || Mount Lemmon || Mount Lemmon Survey || — || align=right data-sort-value="0.78" | 780 m || 
|-id=803 bgcolor=#fefefe
| 374803 ||  || — || October 19, 2006 || Kanab || E. E. Sheridan || — || align=right data-sort-value="0.86" | 860 m || 
|-id=804 bgcolor=#fefefe
| 374804 ||  || — || October 16, 2006 || Kitt Peak || Spacewatch || — || align=right data-sort-value="0.84" | 840 m || 
|-id=805 bgcolor=#fefefe
| 374805 ||  || — || October 16, 2006 || Kitt Peak || Spacewatch || NYS || align=right data-sort-value="0.66" | 660 m || 
|-id=806 bgcolor=#fefefe
| 374806 ||  || — || September 30, 2006 || Mount Lemmon || Mount Lemmon Survey || — || align=right data-sort-value="0.76" | 760 m || 
|-id=807 bgcolor=#fefefe
| 374807 ||  || — || October 16, 2006 || Kitt Peak || Spacewatch || V || align=right data-sort-value="0.68" | 680 m || 
|-id=808 bgcolor=#fefefe
| 374808 ||  || — || October 16, 2006 || Kitt Peak || Spacewatch || — || align=right | 1.1 km || 
|-id=809 bgcolor=#fefefe
| 374809 ||  || — || October 16, 2006 || Kitt Peak || Spacewatch || V || align=right data-sort-value="0.65" | 650 m || 
|-id=810 bgcolor=#fefefe
| 374810 ||  || — || October 16, 2006 || Catalina || CSS || — || align=right data-sort-value="0.87" | 870 m || 
|-id=811 bgcolor=#fefefe
| 374811 ||  || — || October 16, 2006 || Catalina || CSS || V || align=right data-sort-value="0.91" | 910 m || 
|-id=812 bgcolor=#fefefe
| 374812 ||  || — || October 16, 2006 || Catalina || CSS || V || align=right data-sort-value="0.89" | 890 m || 
|-id=813 bgcolor=#fefefe
| 374813 ||  || — || October 17, 2006 || Kitt Peak || Spacewatch || — || align=right data-sort-value="0.87" | 870 m || 
|-id=814 bgcolor=#fefefe
| 374814 ||  || — || October 17, 2006 || Mount Lemmon || Mount Lemmon Survey || FLO || align=right data-sort-value="0.66" | 660 m || 
|-id=815 bgcolor=#fefefe
| 374815 ||  || — || September 30, 2006 || Mount Lemmon || Mount Lemmon Survey || — || align=right data-sort-value="0.64" | 640 m || 
|-id=816 bgcolor=#fefefe
| 374816 ||  || — || October 19, 2006 || Kitt Peak || Spacewatch || V || align=right data-sort-value="0.71" | 710 m || 
|-id=817 bgcolor=#fefefe
| 374817 ||  || — || September 30, 2006 || Mount Lemmon || Mount Lemmon Survey || NYS || align=right data-sort-value="0.59" | 590 m || 
|-id=818 bgcolor=#fefefe
| 374818 ||  || — || October 19, 2006 || Kitt Peak || Spacewatch || — || align=right data-sort-value="0.94" | 940 m || 
|-id=819 bgcolor=#fefefe
| 374819 ||  || — || October 19, 2006 || Mount Lemmon || Mount Lemmon Survey || — || align=right data-sort-value="0.92" | 920 m || 
|-id=820 bgcolor=#fefefe
| 374820 ||  || — || October 19, 2006 || Kitt Peak || Spacewatch || — || align=right data-sort-value="0.81" | 810 m || 
|-id=821 bgcolor=#fefefe
| 374821 ||  || — || October 21, 2006 || Mount Lemmon || Mount Lemmon Survey || V || align=right data-sort-value="0.53" | 530 m || 
|-id=822 bgcolor=#d6d6d6
| 374822 ||  || — || October 3, 2006 || Mount Lemmon || Mount Lemmon Survey || KOR || align=right | 1.3 km || 
|-id=823 bgcolor=#fefefe
| 374823 ||  || — || October 22, 2006 || Mount Lemmon || Mount Lemmon Survey || NYS || align=right data-sort-value="0.72" | 720 m || 
|-id=824 bgcolor=#fefefe
| 374824 ||  || — || October 16, 2006 || Catalina || CSS || — || align=right data-sort-value="0.67" | 670 m || 
|-id=825 bgcolor=#fefefe
| 374825 ||  || — || October 16, 2006 || Catalina || CSS || V || align=right data-sort-value="0.82" | 820 m || 
|-id=826 bgcolor=#fefefe
| 374826 ||  || — || October 20, 2006 || Kitt Peak || Spacewatch || — || align=right data-sort-value="0.84" | 840 m || 
|-id=827 bgcolor=#fefefe
| 374827 ||  || — || September 27, 2006 || Mount Lemmon || Mount Lemmon Survey || NYS || align=right data-sort-value="0.58" | 580 m || 
|-id=828 bgcolor=#fefefe
| 374828 ||  || — || October 16, 2006 || Kitt Peak || Spacewatch || V || align=right data-sort-value="0.66" | 660 m || 
|-id=829 bgcolor=#fefefe
| 374829 ||  || — || October 17, 2006 || Catalina || CSS || FLO || align=right data-sort-value="0.70" | 700 m || 
|-id=830 bgcolor=#fefefe
| 374830 ||  || — || October 17, 2006 || Catalina || CSS || — || align=right data-sort-value="0.94" | 940 m || 
|-id=831 bgcolor=#fefefe
| 374831 ||  || — || October 21, 2006 || Palomar || NEAT || — || align=right data-sort-value="0.75" | 750 m || 
|-id=832 bgcolor=#fefefe
| 374832 ||  || — || October 12, 2006 || Kitt Peak || Spacewatch || NYS || align=right data-sort-value="0.55" | 550 m || 
|-id=833 bgcolor=#fefefe
| 374833 ||  || — || October 23, 2006 || Mount Lemmon || Mount Lemmon Survey || — || align=right | 2.4 km || 
|-id=834 bgcolor=#fefefe
| 374834 ||  || — || October 27, 2006 || Kitt Peak || Spacewatch || — || align=right data-sort-value="0.78" | 780 m || 
|-id=835 bgcolor=#fefefe
| 374835 ||  || — || October 27, 2006 || Mount Lemmon || Mount Lemmon Survey || — || align=right data-sort-value="0.49" | 490 m || 
|-id=836 bgcolor=#fefefe
| 374836 ||  || — || October 27, 2006 || Mount Lemmon || Mount Lemmon Survey || NYS || align=right data-sort-value="0.42" | 420 m || 
|-id=837 bgcolor=#fefefe
| 374837 ||  || — || October 28, 2006 || Kitt Peak || Spacewatch || ERI || align=right | 1.2 km || 
|-id=838 bgcolor=#fefefe
| 374838 ||  || — || October 27, 2006 || Mount Lemmon || Mount Lemmon Survey || PHO || align=right data-sort-value="0.96" | 960 m || 
|-id=839 bgcolor=#fefefe
| 374839 ||  || — || October 27, 2006 || Catalina || CSS || V || align=right data-sort-value="0.87" | 870 m || 
|-id=840 bgcolor=#fefefe
| 374840 ||  || — || October 27, 2006 || Mount Lemmon || Mount Lemmon Survey || — || align=right data-sort-value="0.69" | 690 m || 
|-id=841 bgcolor=#fefefe
| 374841 ||  || — || September 18, 2006 || Catalina || CSS || — || align=right | 1.0 km || 
|-id=842 bgcolor=#fefefe
| 374842 ||  || — || October 27, 2006 || Mount Lemmon || Mount Lemmon Survey || MAS || align=right data-sort-value="0.62" | 620 m || 
|-id=843 bgcolor=#fefefe
| 374843 ||  || — || October 27, 2006 || Kitt Peak || Spacewatch || NYS || align=right data-sort-value="0.69" | 690 m || 
|-id=844 bgcolor=#fefefe
| 374844 ||  || — || October 28, 2006 || Mount Lemmon || Mount Lemmon Survey || — || align=right data-sort-value="0.65" | 650 m || 
|-id=845 bgcolor=#fefefe
| 374845 ||  || — || October 19, 2006 || Kitt Peak || M. W. Buie || FLO || align=right data-sort-value="0.79" | 790 m || 
|-id=846 bgcolor=#fefefe
| 374846 ||  || — || October 20, 2006 || Kitt Peak || M. W. Buie || — || align=right data-sort-value="0.94" | 940 m || 
|-id=847 bgcolor=#fefefe
| 374847 ||  || — || October 20, 2006 || Mount Lemmon || Mount Lemmon Survey || MAS || align=right data-sort-value="0.58" | 580 m || 
|-id=848 bgcolor=#fefefe
| 374848 Arturomalignani || 2006 VK ||  || November 2, 2006 || Remanzacco || Remanzacco Obs. || — || align=right data-sort-value="0.86" | 860 m || 
|-id=849 bgcolor=#FA8072
| 374849 ||  || — || September 28, 2006 || Mount Lemmon || Mount Lemmon Survey || — || align=right data-sort-value="0.76" | 760 m || 
|-id=850 bgcolor=#fefefe
| 374850 ||  || — || October 19, 2006 || Catalina || CSS || FLO || align=right data-sort-value="0.64" | 640 m || 
|-id=851 bgcolor=#FFC2E0
| 374851 ||  || — || November 11, 2006 || Socorro || LINEAR || APO +1kmPHAmoon || align=right | 1.6 km || 
|-id=852 bgcolor=#fefefe
| 374852 ||  || — || November 9, 2006 || Kitt Peak || Spacewatch || — || align=right data-sort-value="0.92" | 920 m || 
|-id=853 bgcolor=#fefefe
| 374853 ||  || — || October 21, 2006 || Kitt Peak || Spacewatch || — || align=right data-sort-value="0.96" | 960 m || 
|-id=854 bgcolor=#fefefe
| 374854 ||  || — || November 10, 2006 || Kitt Peak || Spacewatch || MAS || align=right data-sort-value="0.67" | 670 m || 
|-id=855 bgcolor=#FFC2E0
| 374855 ||  || — || November 14, 2006 || Socorro || LINEAR || APOPHA || align=right data-sort-value="0.34" | 340 m || 
|-id=856 bgcolor=#fefefe
| 374856 ||  || — || November 9, 2006 || Kitt Peak || Spacewatch || — || align=right data-sort-value="0.91" | 910 m || 
|-id=857 bgcolor=#fefefe
| 374857 ||  || — || September 28, 2006 || Mount Lemmon || Mount Lemmon Survey || NYS || align=right data-sort-value="0.62" | 620 m || 
|-id=858 bgcolor=#fefefe
| 374858 ||  || — || November 10, 2006 || Kitt Peak || Spacewatch || NYS || align=right data-sort-value="0.74" | 740 m || 
|-id=859 bgcolor=#fefefe
| 374859 ||  || — || November 10, 2006 || Kitt Peak || Spacewatch || MAS || align=right data-sort-value="0.59" | 590 m || 
|-id=860 bgcolor=#fefefe
| 374860 ||  || — || October 4, 2006 || Mount Lemmon || Mount Lemmon Survey || NYS || align=right data-sort-value="0.71" | 710 m || 
|-id=861 bgcolor=#fefefe
| 374861 ||  || — || October 4, 2006 || Mount Lemmon || Mount Lemmon Survey || NYS || align=right data-sort-value="0.66" | 660 m || 
|-id=862 bgcolor=#fefefe
| 374862 ||  || — || November 11, 2006 || Mount Lemmon || Mount Lemmon Survey || — || align=right data-sort-value="0.73" | 730 m || 
|-id=863 bgcolor=#fefefe
| 374863 ||  || — || November 12, 2006 || Mount Lemmon || Mount Lemmon Survey || — || align=right | 1.0 km || 
|-id=864 bgcolor=#fefefe
| 374864 ||  || — || November 10, 2006 || Kitt Peak || Spacewatch || MAS || align=right data-sort-value="0.56" | 560 m || 
|-id=865 bgcolor=#fefefe
| 374865 ||  || — || November 10, 2006 || Kitt Peak || Spacewatch || NYS || align=right data-sort-value="0.72" | 720 m || 
|-id=866 bgcolor=#fefefe
| 374866 ||  || — || November 11, 2006 || Kitt Peak || Spacewatch || MAS || align=right data-sort-value="0.66" | 660 m || 
|-id=867 bgcolor=#fefefe
| 374867 ||  || — || November 11, 2006 || Kitt Peak || Spacewatch || — || align=right data-sort-value="0.90" | 900 m || 
|-id=868 bgcolor=#fefefe
| 374868 ||  || — || November 11, 2006 || Kitt Peak || Spacewatch || MAS || align=right data-sort-value="0.82" | 820 m || 
|-id=869 bgcolor=#fefefe
| 374869 ||  || — || November 13, 2006 || Kitt Peak || Spacewatch || V || align=right data-sort-value="0.61" | 610 m || 
|-id=870 bgcolor=#fefefe
| 374870 ||  || — || November 13, 2006 || Kitt Peak || Spacewatch || — || align=right | 1.0 km || 
|-id=871 bgcolor=#fefefe
| 374871 ||  || — || November 13, 2006 || Mount Lemmon || Mount Lemmon Survey || — || align=right data-sort-value="0.80" | 800 m || 
|-id=872 bgcolor=#d6d6d6
| 374872 ||  || — || November 14, 2006 || Kitt Peak || Spacewatch || 3:2 || align=right | 4.6 km || 
|-id=873 bgcolor=#fefefe
| 374873 ||  || — || November 14, 2006 || Kitt Peak || Spacewatch || V || align=right data-sort-value="0.52" | 520 m || 
|-id=874 bgcolor=#fefefe
| 374874 ||  || — || September 28, 2006 || Mount Lemmon || Mount Lemmon Survey || NYS || align=right data-sort-value="0.62" | 620 m || 
|-id=875 bgcolor=#fefefe
| 374875 ||  || — || November 14, 2006 || Kitt Peak || Spacewatch || MAS || align=right data-sort-value="0.61" | 610 m || 
|-id=876 bgcolor=#fefefe
| 374876 ||  || — || November 15, 2006 || Kitt Peak || Spacewatch || — || align=right data-sort-value="0.79" | 790 m || 
|-id=877 bgcolor=#fefefe
| 374877 ||  || — || November 15, 2006 || Catalina || CSS || FLO || align=right data-sort-value="0.70" | 700 m || 
|-id=878 bgcolor=#fefefe
| 374878 ||  || — || November 15, 2006 || Kitt Peak || Spacewatch || — || align=right data-sort-value="0.77" | 770 m || 
|-id=879 bgcolor=#fefefe
| 374879 ||  || — || October 17, 2006 || Kitt Peak || Spacewatch || V || align=right data-sort-value="0.73" | 730 m || 
|-id=880 bgcolor=#fefefe
| 374880 ||  || — || October 3, 2006 || Mount Lemmon || Mount Lemmon Survey || — || align=right data-sort-value="0.78" | 780 m || 
|-id=881 bgcolor=#fefefe
| 374881 ||  || — || November 16, 2006 || Kitt Peak || Spacewatch || NYS || align=right data-sort-value="0.60" | 600 m || 
|-id=882 bgcolor=#fefefe
| 374882 ||  || — || September 27, 2006 || Mount Lemmon || Mount Lemmon Survey || NYS || align=right data-sort-value="0.65" | 650 m || 
|-id=883 bgcolor=#fefefe
| 374883 ||  || — || November 16, 2006 || Kitt Peak || Spacewatch || NYS || align=right data-sort-value="0.59" | 590 m || 
|-id=884 bgcolor=#fefefe
| 374884 ||  || — || November 16, 2006 || Kitt Peak || Spacewatch || — || align=right data-sort-value="0.81" | 810 m || 
|-id=885 bgcolor=#fefefe
| 374885 ||  || — || November 16, 2006 || Socorro || LINEAR || — || align=right | 1.2 km || 
|-id=886 bgcolor=#fefefe
| 374886 ||  || — || October 28, 2006 || Mount Lemmon || Mount Lemmon Survey || NYS || align=right data-sort-value="0.62" | 620 m || 
|-id=887 bgcolor=#fefefe
| 374887 ||  || — || November 16, 2006 || Kitt Peak || Spacewatch || — || align=right data-sort-value="0.98" | 980 m || 
|-id=888 bgcolor=#d6d6d6
| 374888 ||  || — || November 16, 2006 || Kitt Peak || Spacewatch || THM || align=right | 2.0 km || 
|-id=889 bgcolor=#fefefe
| 374889 ||  || — || November 16, 2006 || Kitt Peak || Spacewatch || NYS || align=right data-sort-value="0.88" | 880 m || 
|-id=890 bgcolor=#fefefe
| 374890 ||  || — || November 18, 2006 || Kitt Peak || Spacewatch || NYS || align=right data-sort-value="0.54" | 540 m || 
|-id=891 bgcolor=#fefefe
| 374891 ||  || — || November 18, 2006 || Kitt Peak || Spacewatch || — || align=right data-sort-value="0.66" | 660 m || 
|-id=892 bgcolor=#fefefe
| 374892 ||  || — || November 18, 2006 || Kitt Peak || Spacewatch || — || align=right data-sort-value="0.89" | 890 m || 
|-id=893 bgcolor=#fefefe
| 374893 ||  || — || November 18, 2006 || Kitt Peak || Spacewatch || — || align=right data-sort-value="0.69" | 690 m || 
|-id=894 bgcolor=#fefefe
| 374894 ||  || — || September 27, 2006 || Mount Lemmon || Mount Lemmon Survey || — || align=right data-sort-value="0.80" | 800 m || 
|-id=895 bgcolor=#fefefe
| 374895 ||  || — || September 18, 2006 || Catalina || CSS || — || align=right data-sort-value="0.79" | 790 m || 
|-id=896 bgcolor=#fefefe
| 374896 ||  || — || September 27, 2006 || Mount Lemmon || Mount Lemmon Survey || FLO || align=right data-sort-value="0.53" | 530 m || 
|-id=897 bgcolor=#fefefe
| 374897 ||  || — || October 19, 2006 || Mount Lemmon || Mount Lemmon Survey || NYS || align=right data-sort-value="0.81" | 810 m || 
|-id=898 bgcolor=#fefefe
| 374898 ||  || — || November 11, 2006 || Kitt Peak || Spacewatch || — || align=right data-sort-value="0.95" | 950 m || 
|-id=899 bgcolor=#fefefe
| 374899 ||  || — || November 20, 2006 || Mount Lemmon || Mount Lemmon Survey || — || align=right data-sort-value="0.63" | 630 m || 
|-id=900 bgcolor=#fefefe
| 374900 ||  || — || November 22, 2006 || Socorro || LINEAR || — || align=right data-sort-value="0.83" | 830 m || 
|}

374901–375000 

|-bgcolor=#fefefe
| 374901 ||  || — || November 22, 2006 || Mount Lemmon || Mount Lemmon Survey || — || align=right data-sort-value="0.93" | 930 m || 
|-id=902 bgcolor=#fefefe
| 374902 ||  || — || November 23, 2006 || Kitt Peak || Spacewatch || V || align=right data-sort-value="0.64" | 640 m || 
|-id=903 bgcolor=#fefefe
| 374903 ||  || — || November 24, 2006 || Mount Lemmon || Mount Lemmon Survey || NYS || align=right data-sort-value="0.70" | 700 m || 
|-id=904 bgcolor=#fefefe
| 374904 ||  || — || November 21, 2006 || Mount Lemmon || Mount Lemmon Survey || NYS || align=right data-sort-value="0.64" | 640 m || 
|-id=905 bgcolor=#fefefe
| 374905 ||  || — || November 21, 2006 || Mount Lemmon || Mount Lemmon Survey || NYS || align=right data-sort-value="0.81" | 810 m || 
|-id=906 bgcolor=#fefefe
| 374906 ||  || — || November 27, 2006 || Mount Lemmon || Mount Lemmon Survey || — || align=right data-sort-value="0.81" | 810 m || 
|-id=907 bgcolor=#FA8072
| 374907 ||  || — || December 10, 2006 || Socorro || LINEAR || — || align=right data-sort-value="0.82" | 820 m || 
|-id=908 bgcolor=#fefefe
| 374908 ||  || — || November 15, 2006 || Mount Lemmon || Mount Lemmon Survey || NYS || align=right data-sort-value="0.66" | 660 m || 
|-id=909 bgcolor=#fefefe
| 374909 ||  || — || December 10, 2006 || Kitt Peak || Spacewatch || MAS || align=right data-sort-value="0.85" | 850 m || 
|-id=910 bgcolor=#fefefe
| 374910 ||  || — || December 10, 2006 || Kitt Peak || Spacewatch || V || align=right data-sort-value="0.90" | 900 m || 
|-id=911 bgcolor=#fefefe
| 374911 ||  || — || December 10, 2006 || Kitt Peak || Spacewatch || — || align=right | 1.1 km || 
|-id=912 bgcolor=#fefefe
| 374912 ||  || — || September 16, 1998 || Kitt Peak || Spacewatch || MAS || align=right data-sort-value="0.73" | 730 m || 
|-id=913 bgcolor=#fefefe
| 374913 ||  || — || October 21, 2006 || Lulin Observatory || Lulin Obs. || — || align=right | 1.0 km || 
|-id=914 bgcolor=#fefefe
| 374914 ||  || — || December 11, 2006 || Kitt Peak || Spacewatch || MAS || align=right data-sort-value="0.79" | 790 m || 
|-id=915 bgcolor=#fefefe
| 374915 ||  || — || December 14, 2006 || Mount Lemmon || Mount Lemmon Survey || NYS || align=right | 1.0 km || 
|-id=916 bgcolor=#fefefe
| 374916 ||  || — || December 15, 2006 || Socorro || LINEAR || NYS || align=right data-sort-value="0.81" | 810 m || 
|-id=917 bgcolor=#fefefe
| 374917 ||  || — || December 14, 2006 || Kitt Peak || Spacewatch || NYS || align=right data-sort-value="0.74" | 740 m || 
|-id=918 bgcolor=#fefefe
| 374918 ||  || — || December 15, 2006 || Kitt Peak || Spacewatch || NYS || align=right data-sort-value="0.54" | 540 m || 
|-id=919 bgcolor=#fefefe
| 374919 ||  || — || December 14, 2006 || Mount Lemmon || Mount Lemmon Survey || NYS || align=right data-sort-value="0.90" | 900 m || 
|-id=920 bgcolor=#fefefe
| 374920 ||  || — || December 13, 2006 || Mount Lemmon || Mount Lemmon Survey || MAS || align=right data-sort-value="0.78" | 780 m || 
|-id=921 bgcolor=#fefefe
| 374921 ||  || — || December 14, 2006 || Kitt Peak || Spacewatch || MAS || align=right data-sort-value="0.78" | 780 m || 
|-id=922 bgcolor=#fefefe
| 374922 ||  || — || December 19, 2006 || Eskridge || Farpoint Obs. || MAS || align=right data-sort-value="0.71" | 710 m || 
|-id=923 bgcolor=#fefefe
| 374923 ||  || — || December 16, 2006 || Kitt Peak || Spacewatch || MAS || align=right data-sort-value="0.78" | 780 m || 
|-id=924 bgcolor=#fefefe
| 374924 ||  || — || December 20, 2006 || Mount Lemmon || Mount Lemmon Survey || MAS || align=right data-sort-value="0.85" | 850 m || 
|-id=925 bgcolor=#fefefe
| 374925 ||  || — || December 18, 2006 || Nyukasa || Mount Nyukasa Stn. || V || align=right data-sort-value="0.77" | 770 m || 
|-id=926 bgcolor=#fefefe
| 374926 ||  || — || November 1, 2006 || Mount Lemmon || Mount Lemmon Survey || MAS || align=right data-sort-value="0.88" | 880 m || 
|-id=927 bgcolor=#fefefe
| 374927 ||  || — || December 21, 2006 || Mount Lemmon || Mount Lemmon Survey || NYS || align=right data-sort-value="0.79" | 790 m || 
|-id=928 bgcolor=#E9E9E9
| 374928 ||  || — || December 21, 2006 || Kitt Peak || Spacewatch || — || align=right | 1.4 km || 
|-id=929 bgcolor=#fefefe
| 374929 ||  || — || November 19, 2006 || Kitt Peak || Spacewatch || — || align=right | 1.0 km || 
|-id=930 bgcolor=#fefefe
| 374930 ||  || — || November 21, 2006 || Mount Lemmon || Mount Lemmon Survey || MAS || align=right data-sort-value="0.78" | 780 m || 
|-id=931 bgcolor=#fefefe
| 374931 ||  || — || January 10, 2007 || Catalina || CSS || — || align=right | 1.0 km || 
|-id=932 bgcolor=#fefefe
| 374932 ||  || — || January 15, 2007 || Catalina || CSS || NYS || align=right | 1.0 km || 
|-id=933 bgcolor=#fefefe
| 374933 ||  || — || January 10, 2007 || Mount Lemmon || Mount Lemmon Survey || V || align=right data-sort-value="0.88" | 880 m || 
|-id=934 bgcolor=#fefefe
| 374934 ||  || — || January 10, 2007 || Mount Lemmon || Mount Lemmon Survey || NYS || align=right data-sort-value="0.71" | 710 m || 
|-id=935 bgcolor=#fefefe
| 374935 ||  || — || November 15, 2006 || Mount Lemmon || Mount Lemmon Survey || — || align=right | 1.1 km || 
|-id=936 bgcolor=#fefefe
| 374936 ||  || — || November 27, 2006 || Mount Lemmon || Mount Lemmon Survey || NYS || align=right data-sort-value="0.70" | 700 m || 
|-id=937 bgcolor=#fefefe
| 374937 ||  || — || January 16, 2007 || Socorro || LINEAR || MAS || align=right data-sort-value="0.92" | 920 m || 
|-id=938 bgcolor=#fefefe
| 374938 ||  || — || January 23, 2007 || Anderson Mesa || LONEOS || — || align=right | 1.1 km || 
|-id=939 bgcolor=#fefefe
| 374939 ||  || — || January 24, 2007 || Mount Lemmon || Mount Lemmon Survey || NYS || align=right data-sort-value="0.62" | 620 m || 
|-id=940 bgcolor=#E9E9E9
| 374940 ||  || — || January 24, 2007 || Mount Lemmon || Mount Lemmon Survey || — || align=right data-sort-value="0.96" | 960 m || 
|-id=941 bgcolor=#fefefe
| 374941 ||  || — || December 27, 2006 || Mount Lemmon || Mount Lemmon Survey || — || align=right data-sort-value="0.85" | 850 m || 
|-id=942 bgcolor=#fefefe
| 374942 ||  || — || January 24, 2007 || Mount Lemmon || Mount Lemmon Survey || MAS || align=right data-sort-value="0.60" | 600 m || 
|-id=943 bgcolor=#E9E9E9
| 374943 ||  || — || January 26, 2007 || Piszkéstető || K. Sárneczky || — || align=right data-sort-value="0.96" | 960 m || 
|-id=944 bgcolor=#E9E9E9
| 374944 ||  || — || January 24, 2007 || Mount Lemmon || Mount Lemmon Survey || — || align=right data-sort-value="0.95" | 950 m || 
|-id=945 bgcolor=#fefefe
| 374945 ||  || — || January 24, 2007 || Socorro || LINEAR || — || align=right | 1.0 km || 
|-id=946 bgcolor=#fefefe
| 374946 ||  || — || January 27, 2007 || Mount Lemmon || Mount Lemmon Survey || MAS || align=right data-sort-value="0.80" | 800 m || 
|-id=947 bgcolor=#E9E9E9
| 374947 ||  || — || January 27, 2007 || Mount Lemmon || Mount Lemmon Survey || — || align=right | 1.4 km || 
|-id=948 bgcolor=#E9E9E9
| 374948 ||  || — || January 17, 2007 || Kitt Peak || Spacewatch || — || align=right | 1.2 km || 
|-id=949 bgcolor=#fefefe
| 374949 ||  || — || December 23, 2006 || Mount Lemmon || Mount Lemmon Survey || — || align=right data-sort-value="0.83" | 830 m || 
|-id=950 bgcolor=#fefefe
| 374950 ||  || — || November 21, 2006 || Mount Lemmon || Mount Lemmon Survey || NYS || align=right data-sort-value="0.86" | 860 m || 
|-id=951 bgcolor=#fefefe
| 374951 ||  || — || November 21, 2006 || Mount Lemmon || Mount Lemmon Survey || NYS || align=right data-sort-value="0.81" | 810 m || 
|-id=952 bgcolor=#E9E9E9
| 374952 ||  || — || February 7, 2007 || Mount Lemmon || Mount Lemmon Survey || ADE || align=right | 2.2 km || 
|-id=953 bgcolor=#fefefe
| 374953 ||  || — || February 6, 2007 || Palomar || NEAT || ERI || align=right | 1.6 km || 
|-id=954 bgcolor=#fefefe
| 374954 ||  || — || February 6, 2007 || Mount Lemmon || Mount Lemmon Survey || NYS || align=right data-sort-value="0.75" | 750 m || 
|-id=955 bgcolor=#fefefe
| 374955 ||  || — || February 6, 2007 || Mount Lemmon || Mount Lemmon Survey || MAS || align=right | 1.1 km || 
|-id=956 bgcolor=#fefefe
| 374956 ||  || — || January 10, 2007 || Mount Lemmon || Mount Lemmon Survey || MAS || align=right data-sort-value="0.74" | 740 m || 
|-id=957 bgcolor=#fefefe
| 374957 ||  || — || February 8, 2007 || Mount Lemmon || Mount Lemmon Survey || — || align=right | 1.0 km || 
|-id=958 bgcolor=#E9E9E9
| 374958 ||  || — || February 8, 2007 || Palomar || NEAT || — || align=right | 2.4 km || 
|-id=959 bgcolor=#fefefe
| 374959 ||  || — || February 10, 2007 || Mount Lemmon || Mount Lemmon Survey || NYS || align=right data-sort-value="0.79" | 790 m || 
|-id=960 bgcolor=#E9E9E9
| 374960 ||  || — || February 10, 2007 || Catalina || CSS || — || align=right | 2.4 km || 
|-id=961 bgcolor=#E9E9E9
| 374961 ||  || — || February 15, 2007 || Catalina || CSS || — || align=right | 2.2 km || 
|-id=962 bgcolor=#fefefe
| 374962 ||  || — || February 13, 2007 || Socorro || LINEAR || V || align=right data-sort-value="0.78" | 780 m || 
|-id=963 bgcolor=#E9E9E9
| 374963 ||  || — || February 16, 2007 || Catalina || CSS || — || align=right | 1.3 km || 
|-id=964 bgcolor=#fefefe
| 374964 ||  || — || February 17, 2007 || Kitt Peak || Spacewatch || — || align=right data-sort-value="0.93" | 930 m || 
|-id=965 bgcolor=#E9E9E9
| 374965 ||  || — || February 17, 2007 || Kitt Peak || Spacewatch || — || align=right | 2.2 km || 
|-id=966 bgcolor=#E9E9E9
| 374966 ||  || — || February 17, 2007 || Kitt Peak || Spacewatch || KAZ || align=right data-sort-value="0.92" | 920 m || 
|-id=967 bgcolor=#E9E9E9
| 374967 ||  || — || October 29, 2005 || Mount Lemmon || Mount Lemmon Survey || — || align=right | 1.1 km || 
|-id=968 bgcolor=#E9E9E9
| 374968 ||  || — || February 17, 2007 || Kitt Peak || Spacewatch || — || align=right data-sort-value="0.89" | 890 m || 
|-id=969 bgcolor=#E9E9E9
| 374969 ||  || — || February 17, 2007 || Kitt Peak || Spacewatch || — || align=right | 1.9 km || 
|-id=970 bgcolor=#fefefe
| 374970 ||  || — || February 22, 2007 || Catalina || CSS || H || align=right data-sort-value="0.59" | 590 m || 
|-id=971 bgcolor=#E9E9E9
| 374971 ||  || — || February 17, 2007 || Mount Lemmon || Mount Lemmon Survey || — || align=right data-sort-value="0.77" | 770 m || 
|-id=972 bgcolor=#E9E9E9
| 374972 ||  || — || March 10, 2003 || Anderson Mesa || LONEOS || — || align=right | 1.7 km || 
|-id=973 bgcolor=#E9E9E9
| 374973 ||  || — || February 17, 2007 || Mount Lemmon || Mount Lemmon Survey || — || align=right | 1.7 km || 
|-id=974 bgcolor=#fefefe
| 374974 ||  || — || February 21, 2007 || Mount Lemmon || Mount Lemmon Survey || — || align=right data-sort-value="0.86" | 860 m || 
|-id=975 bgcolor=#E9E9E9
| 374975 ||  || — || September 18, 1999 || Kitt Peak || Spacewatch || — || align=right | 2.4 km || 
|-id=976 bgcolor=#E9E9E9
| 374976 ||  || — || February 23, 2007 || Kitt Peak || Spacewatch || — || align=right | 1.4 km || 
|-id=977 bgcolor=#E9E9E9
| 374977 ||  || — || February 17, 2007 || Mount Lemmon || Mount Lemmon Survey || — || align=right | 1.1 km || 
|-id=978 bgcolor=#E9E9E9
| 374978 ||  || — || March 9, 2007 || Mount Lemmon || Mount Lemmon Survey || — || align=right | 2.4 km || 
|-id=979 bgcolor=#E9E9E9
| 374979 ||  || — || March 9, 2007 || Mount Lemmon || Mount Lemmon Survey || HNS || align=right | 1.1 km || 
|-id=980 bgcolor=#E9E9E9
| 374980 ||  || — || March 10, 2007 || Mount Lemmon || Mount Lemmon Survey || — || align=right | 2.1 km || 
|-id=981 bgcolor=#E9E9E9
| 374981 ||  || — || February 26, 2007 || Mount Lemmon || Mount Lemmon Survey || — || align=right | 1.7 km || 
|-id=982 bgcolor=#E9E9E9
| 374982 ||  || — || March 11, 2007 || Anderson Mesa || LONEOS || — || align=right | 2.3 km || 
|-id=983 bgcolor=#E9E9E9
| 374983 ||  || — || February 27, 2007 || Kitt Peak || Spacewatch || — || align=right | 1.8 km || 
|-id=984 bgcolor=#E9E9E9
| 374984 ||  || — || March 11, 2007 || Mount Lemmon || Mount Lemmon Survey || — || align=right | 1.7 km || 
|-id=985 bgcolor=#fefefe
| 374985 ||  || — || March 10, 2007 || Kitt Peak || Spacewatch || H || align=right data-sort-value="0.54" | 540 m || 
|-id=986 bgcolor=#E9E9E9
| 374986 ||  || — || March 10, 2007 || Mount Lemmon || Mount Lemmon Survey || — || align=right | 1.2 km || 
|-id=987 bgcolor=#E9E9E9
| 374987 ||  || — || March 11, 2007 || Kitt Peak || Spacewatch || — || align=right | 1.8 km || 
|-id=988 bgcolor=#E9E9E9
| 374988 ||  || — || March 27, 2003 || Kitt Peak || Spacewatch || — || align=right | 1.7 km || 
|-id=989 bgcolor=#E9E9E9
| 374989 ||  || — || March 13, 2007 || Kitt Peak || Spacewatch || — || align=right | 2.3 km || 
|-id=990 bgcolor=#E9E9E9
| 374990 ||  || — || March 14, 2007 || Kitt Peak || Spacewatch || — || align=right | 1.7 km || 
|-id=991 bgcolor=#fefefe
| 374991 ||  || — || March 11, 2007 || Kitt Peak || Spacewatch || — || align=right data-sort-value="0.65" | 650 m || 
|-id=992 bgcolor=#E9E9E9
| 374992 ||  || — || March 14, 2007 || Kitt Peak || Spacewatch || — || align=right | 1.0 km || 
|-id=993 bgcolor=#E9E9E9
| 374993 ||  || — || March 13, 2007 || Kitt Peak || Spacewatch || — || align=right | 1.9 km || 
|-id=994 bgcolor=#E9E9E9
| 374994 ||  || — || March 15, 2007 || Kitt Peak || Spacewatch || ADE || align=right | 1.7 km || 
|-id=995 bgcolor=#fefefe
| 374995 ||  || — || March 8, 2007 || Palomar || NEAT || NYS || align=right data-sort-value="0.72" | 720 m || 
|-id=996 bgcolor=#E9E9E9
| 374996 ||  || — || March 10, 2007 || Kitt Peak || Spacewatch || — || align=right | 2.0 km || 
|-id=997 bgcolor=#E9E9E9
| 374997 ||  || — || March 13, 2007 || Kitt Peak || Spacewatch || — || align=right | 1.1 km || 
|-id=998 bgcolor=#E9E9E9
| 374998 ||  || — || March 11, 2007 || Kitt Peak || Spacewatch || — || align=right | 2.7 km || 
|-id=999 bgcolor=#fefefe
| 374999 ||  || — || March 11, 2007 || Catalina || CSS || H || align=right data-sort-value="0.77" | 770 m || 
|-id=000 bgcolor=#E9E9E9
| 375000 ||  || — || March 14, 2007 || Mount Lemmon || Mount Lemmon Survey || — || align=right | 1.9 km || 
|}

References

External links 
 Discovery Circumstances: Numbered Minor Planets (370001)–(375000) (IAU Minor Planet Center)

0374